= List of virtual reality headsets =

Comparison chart of per-eye headset resolutions

There are two primary categories of virtual reality (VR) headsets:

- Standalone – devices that have all necessary components to provide virtual reality experiences integrated into the headset. Mainstream standalone VR platforms include:
  - Oculus Mobile SDK, developed by Oculus VR for its own standalone headsets and the Samsung Gear VR. (The SDK has been deprecated in favor of OpenXR, released in July 2021.)
- Tethered – headsets that act as a display device to another device, like a PC or a video game console, to provide a virtual reality experience. Mainstream tethered VR platforms include:
  - SteamVR, part of the Steam service by Valve. The SteamVR platform uses the OpenVR SDK to support headsets from multiple manufacturers, including HTC, Windows Mixed Reality headset manufacturers, and Valve themselves. A list of supported video games can be found here.
  - Oculus PC SDK for Oculus Rift and Oculus Rift S. The list of supported games is here.
  - Windows Mixed Reality (also referred to as "Windows MR" or "WMR"), developed by Microsoft Corporation for Windows 10, version 20H2, through Windows 11, version 23H2 PCs.
  - PlayStation VR, developed by Sony Computer Entertainment for use with PlayStation 4 and PlayStation 5 (PlayStation VR2) home video game console.
  - Open Source Virtual Reality (also referred to as "OSVR"). The list of supported games is here.

Other categories include mobile headsets, which combine a smartphone with a mount, and hybrid solutions like the Oculus Quest with the Oculus Link feature that allows the standalone device to also serve as a tethered headset.

In addition, VR headsets are categorized by the degrees of freedom they provide:

- 3DoF: 3 degrees of freedom, which only tracks the rotation of the player's head.
- 6DoF: 6 degrees of freedom, which tracks both the position and the rotation of the player.

== Early VR ==
Product	Release (Y-M-D)	Head tracking	Positional tracking	Display	Resolution (per eye)	Field of view	Price	other
Virtuality 1000CS	1991	Yes	Yes	Dual LCD	276x372		discontinued	6Dof Controller
Forte VFX1	1995	Pitch+roll: 70° Yaw	No	Dual 0.7" LCDs	263x230	diagonal 45°	discontinued ($599 at release)	
IIS VFX3D	2000	Pitch+roll: ±70° Yaw: 360°	No	Dual 0.7" LCDs	≈380x337	diagonal 35°	discontinued	6DoF dual controllers
Fakespace Labs Wide5	2007						discontinued	
NVIS nVisor SX							discontinued	
NVIS nVisor SX111						diagonal 90°	discontinued	
NVIS ST50							discontinued	
Sensics xSight 6123							discontinued	
Sensics piSight 76-21							discontinued	
Crescent HEWDD-768	2008						discontinued ($80,000 at release)	
Crescent HEWDD-1080							discontinued ($103,660 at release)	
Nintendo Virtual Boy	1995-07-21	No	No	Mirror-reflected LEDs array	384x224	diagonal 45°	discontinued ($179.95 at release)	red monochromatic display
VPL EyePhone	1989-06-01				320×240		discontinued ($250,000 at release)	

== Tethered and non-Tethered VR ==
Name	Release date (Y-M-D)	Positional tracking	Display type	Display (other)	Max. Resolution (per eye)	Resolution (per eye, region specific)	PPD	Aspect Ratio (per eye)	Refresh rate	Field of view	Audio	Connectivity	Weight	Price	OSVR	SteamVR	Oculus PC	PlayStation	PC	Windows MR	Oculus Store	App Store (Apple)	Other	Processor	Platform	Tethered
Razer OSVR HDK 1.4	2015-11-23	Yes	OLED	N/A	960×1080		9.6	8:9	90 Hz	100°		1x HDMI, 1x USB 2.0	650 g	Discontinued ($299 at release)	Yes	Yes	No	No	Yes	No	No	No	6DoF headset only			Yes
Oculus Rift CV1	2016-03-28	Outside-in (Constellation)	OLED		1080×1200		9.81	9:10	90 Hz	94°	Built-in headphones	1x HDMI 1.4+ 2x USB3.0 (+1x USB 3.0 for touch camera)	470 g	Discontinued ($599 at release with controllers and base stations)	No	Yes	Yes	No	Yes	No	Yes	No	6DoF dual controllers			Yes
HTC Vive	2016-04-05	Yes	OLED		1080×1200		9.81	9:10	90 Hz	110°	1 mm × 3.5 mm audio jack, optional headphones	1x HDMI 1.4+ DisplayPort 1.2+ 2x 3.0 (one usable for accessories)	468 g (improved revision); 550 g (launch units)	Discontinued ($399 at release)	No	Yes	No	No	Yes	No	No	No	6DoF dual controllers			Yes
Razer OSVR HDK 2	2016-07-20 (pre-orders)		OLED	5.5"	1080×1200		9.81	9:10	90 Hz	110°				Discontinued ($399 at release)	Yes	Yes	No	No	Yes	No	No	No	6Dof headset only			Yes
StarBreeze StarVR	2016-08-01 (IMAX)	Outside-in, external optical sensor with fiducial markers	LCD	Dual 5.5"	2560x1440		12.19	16:9	90 Hz	210° Horizontal; 130° Vertical			380 g		No	No	No	No	Yes	No	No	No	6DoF headset only			Yes
PlayStation VR	2016-10-01	Outside-in (using the PlayStation Camera)	OLED		960×1080		9.6	8:9	120 Hz 90 Hz	100°	1 mm × 3.5 mm audio jack		610 g (2016 model); 600 g (2017 model)	$299 (headset, camera, and a game); Move controllers sold separately for $99	No	No	No	Yes; PS4, PS5	Yes	No	No	No	Motion controller input using PlayStation Move and PlayStation Aim			Yes
Fove 0	2017-01-22 (pre-orders)	Yes	OLED	5.7"	1280x1440		14.22 (max); 11.63 (min)	8:9	70 Hz	110° (max); 90° (min)	1 mm × 3.5 mm audio jack	HDMI 1.4; USB 3.0; USB 2.0	520 g	$600	No	No	No	No	Yes	No	No	No	Eye-tracking			Yes
Pimax 4K	2017-01-01	No	LCD		1920×2160		17.45	8:9	60 Hz	110º	2 mm × 3.5 mm audio jack built-in headphones (removable)	1x HDMI 1.4b	620 g	Discontinued ($375 at release)	No	Yes	No	No	Yes	No	No	No	3DoF headset only			Yes
VRgineers VRHero 5K	2017-03-08	Yes (AR tracking, Optitrack and Lighthouse)	LCD	Dual	2560x1440		—N/a	16:9	90 Hz; 60 Hz	—N/a	3.5 mm audio jack, built-in microphone	DisplayPort 1.2	1080 g	Discontinued ($9000 at release)	No	No	No	No	Yes	No	No	No	6DoF headset only			Yes
Deepoon VR E3	2017-03-29	Yes (360º laser room-scale positioning)	AMOLED		1280x1440		11.63	8:9	70 Hz	110º	3.5 mm audio jack		297 g	$336 (Basic) or $731 (with positioning)	No	Yes	No	No	Yes	No	No	No	Eye-tracking			Yes
Dell Visor	2017-10-17	Inside-out markerless	LCD	RGB subpixel	1440x1440		13.09	1:1	90 Hz	110º	3.5 mm audio jack	1x HDMI 2.0; 1x USB 3.0	590 g (1.3 lb)	Discontinued ($350 ($450 with controllers) at release)	No	Yes	No	No	Yes	Yes	No	No	6DoF dual controllers tracked by HMD			Yes
Acer AH101	2017-10-17	Inside-out markerless	LCD	N/A	1440x1440		15.15	1:1	90 Hz	95º	3.5 mm audio jack	1x HDMI 2.0; 1x USB 3.0	350 g	$399.99 (controllers included)	No	Yes	No	No	Yes	Yes	No	No	6DoF dual controllers tracked by HMD			Yes
HP WMR headset	2017-10-17	Inside-out markerless	LCD	N/A	1440x1440		15.15	1:1	90 Hz	95º	3.5 mm audio jack		834 g	$449 (controllers included)	No	Yes	No	No	Yes	Yes	No	No	6DoF dual controllers tracked by HMD			Yes
Lenovo Explorer	2017-10-04	Inside-out markerless	LCD	N/A	1440x1440		13.09	1:1	90 Hz	110º	3.5 mm audio jack	1x HDMI 2.0; 1x USB 3.0	380 g	$349 ($449 with controllers)	No	Yes	No	No	Yes	Yes	No	No	6DoF dual controllers tracked by HMD			Yes
Samsung Odyssey	2017-11-07	Inside-out markerless	AMOLED	N/A	1440x1600		13.09	9:10	90 Hz	110º	built-in AKG headphones, built-in microphone		644 g	$500	No	Yes	No	No	Yes	Yes	No	No	6DoF dual controllers tracked by HMD			Yes
VRgineers VRHero 5K Plus	2017-11-29	Yes (AR tracking, Optitrack and Lighthouse)	OLED	N/A	2560x1440		—N/a	16:9	90 Hz; 70 Hz; 60 Hz	—N/a	3.5 mm audio jack, built-in microphone	DisplayPort 1.2	1080 g	Discontinued	No	No	No	No	Yes	No	No	No	6DoF headset only			Yes
Asus HC102	2018-02-20	Inside-out markerless	LCD	N/A	1440x1440		15.15	1:1	90 Hz	95º	3.5 mm audio jack	1x HDMI 2.0; 1x USB 3.0	400 g	Discontinued ($399 (controllers included) at release)	No	Yes	No	No	Yes	Yes	No	No	6DoF dual controllers tracked by HMD			Yes
HTC Vive Pro	2018-04-05	Yes	AMOLED		1440x1600		13.09	9:10	90 Hz	110°	Built-in headphones (removable); USB-C 3.0	DisplayPort 1.2; USB-C 3.0	550 g (1.22 lb)	Discontinued ($1099 $799 (headset only) at release)	No	Yes	No	No	Yes	No	No	No	6DoF dual controllers, dual frontal cameras			Yes
VRgineers XTAL	2018-06-26	Yes (AR Tracking, Optitrack and Lighthouse)	OLED		2560x1440		—N/a	16:9	70 Hz	—N/a			770 g	Discontinued	No	No	No	No	Yes	No	No	No	Leap Motion hand-tracking, eye-tracking, automatic IPD setting			Yes
StarVR One	2018-08-14	Inside-out markered (Lighthouse)	AMOLED		1830x1464		8.71	5:4	90 Hz	210º			450 g	$3200	No	No	No	No	Yes	No	No	No	Tobii eye tracking			Yes
Samsung Odyssey+	2018-10-22	Inside-out markerless	AMOLED	N/A	1440x1600		13.09	9:10	90 Hz	110º	built-in headphones, built-in microphone		590 g	Discontinued ($500 at release)	No	Yes	No	No	Yes	Yes	No	No	6DoF dual controllers tracked by HMD,, Anti-SDE display			Yes
Pimax 5K Plus	2018-11-30	Inside-out markered (Lighthouse)	LCD	N/A	2560x1440		21.33 (max); 12.05 (min)	16:9	144 Hz; 120 Hz; 90 Hz; 72 Hz	170º ("Wide"); 150º ("Normal") 120º ("Small")	3.5 mm audio jack, built-in microphone	1x proprietary DisplayPort 1.4/USB 3.0 connector	514 g	$699	No	Yes	No	No	Yes	No	No	No	No controllers or tracking base stations included			Yes
VRgineers XTAL (upgraded lenses)	2018-12-11	Yes (AR Tracking, Optitrack and Lighthouse)	OLED		2560x1440		—N/a	16:9	70 Hz	—N/a			1210 g 770 g (headset only)	$5800	No	No	No	No	Yes	No	No	No	Leap Motion hand-tracking, eye-tracking, automatic IPD setting			Yes
Varjo VR-1	2019-02-19	Yes	AMOLED, OLED		1920×1080	1920×1080 (central focal area), 1440x1600 (peripheral display)	60 (central display), 16.55 (peripheral display)		60 Hz (central display); 90 Hz (peripheral display)	87º	3.5 mm audio jack	optical fiber cables with USB-C	605 g	Discontinued ($5995 at release)	No	Yes	No	No	Yes	No	No	No	Eye-tracking. VR & AR			Yes
Varjo Aero	2021-10-21	Yes	mini-LED, LCD		2880x2720		35		90 Hz	115°	3.5 mm audio jack, built-in in-ear headphones with microphone		717 g	$1990	No	Yes	No	No	Yes	No	No	No				Yes
Pimax 8K	2019-02-19	Yes	LCD	Dual	3840x2160	3840x2160 (panel) 2560x1440 (signal)	22.58	16:9	80 Hz; 72 Hz; 64 Hz	170º (horizontal); 130º (vertical)		USB 3.0, DP 1.4	450 g	$899	No	Yes	No	No	Yes	No	No	No	6DoF dual controllers			Yes
Valve Index	2019-05-01	Yes	LCD	N/A	1440x1600		11.07	9:10	144 Hz; 120 Hz; 90 Hz; 80 Hz	130° (maximum)	Off-ear speakers, 3.5 mm audio jack, built-in microphone	Custom cable	809 g	$999 (headset, 2 tracking stations, 2 controllers) $499 (headset)	No	Yes	No	No	Yes	No	No	No	Valve Index Controllers (6DoF with finger tracking)			Yes
HP Reverb	2019-05-06	Inside-out markerless	LCD	N/A	2160x2160		18.94	1:1	90 Hz	114º	removable headphones, two integrated microphones, 3.5 mm audio jack		498 g	Discontinued ($599 (consumer version), $649 for pro at release)	No	Yes	No	No	Yes	Yes	No	No	6DoF dual controllers			Yes
Oculus Rift S	2019-05-21	Inside-out (Oculus Insight)	LCD	N/A	1280x1440		11.63	8:9	80 Hz	90º	In-line audio speakers 1x 3.5 mm audio jack	DisplayPort 1.2; USB 3.0	561 g	Discontinued $399 (at release)	No	Yes	Yes	No	Yes	No	Yes	No	Second Generation Oculus Touch Controllers			Yes
HTC Vive Cosmos	2019-10-03	Inside-out markerless	LCD	N/A	1440x1700		13.09	72:85	90 Hz	110º	In-line audio speakers	USB-C 3.0, DisplayPort 1.2, proprietary connection for mods	702 g	Discontinued $699 (at release)	No	Yes	No	No	Yes	No	No	No	6DoF dual controllers (Mods: eye tracking, WiGig Wireless, Constellation tracking)			Yes
Varjo VR-2	2019-10-15	Yes	AMOLED, OLED		1440x1600	1920×1080 (central focal area), 1440x1600 (peripheral)	60 (central display), 16.55 (peripheral display)	9:10	60 Hz (central display); 90 Hz (peripheral display)	87º		2x DisplayPort 1.2 / 2x mini DisplayPort 1.2; 1x USB-A 3.0	605 g	Discontinued ($5800 (headset only, mandatory support license) at release)	No	Yes	No	No	Yes	No	No	No	Hand tracking (Ultraleap), eye tracking			Yes
Oculus Quest (Oculus Link)	2019-11-18	Inside-out markerless	OLED		1440x1600		14.4	9:10	72 Hz	94º	Integrated stereo speakers, 2 mm × 3.5 mm headphone jack	USB Type-C, Bluetooth, Wi-Fi	571 g	Discontinued ($399 (64 GB), $499 (128 GB) at release)	No	Yes	Yes	No	Yes	No	Yes	No	6DoF dual controllers tracked by HMD, hand tracking			Yes
Oculus Quest 2 (Oculus Link)	2020-10-13	Inside-out markerless	LCD		1832x1920		20.58	229:240; ~23:24	72 Hz; 80 Hz; 90 Hz; 120 Hz	89°	Integrated stereo speakers, 3.5 mm headphone jack	USB Type-C, Bluetooth, Wi-Fi	503 g	$299 (64 GB) (Discontinued) $399 (128 GB) $429 (256 GB)	No	Yes	Yes	No	Yes	No	Yes	No	6DoF dual controllers tracked by HMD, hand tracking			Yes
HP Reverb G2	2020-11-?	Inside-out markerless	LCD		2160x2160		18.95	1:1	90 Hz	114º	Off-ear speakers	DisplayPort 1.3, USB 3.0 type C, power adapter	499 g	$599	No	Yes	No	No	Yes	Yes	No	No	6DoF dual controllers tracked by HMD			Yes
HTC Vive Pro 2	2021-06-04	Yes	LCD		2448x2448		20.4	1:1	90 Hz; 120 Hz	120°	Built-in headphones (removable); USB-C 3.0	Bluetooth, USB-C, DisplayPort 1.2	850 g	$800	No	Yes	No	No	Yes	No	No	No	6DoF dual controllers, dual frontal cameras			Yes
Varjo VR-3	2021-09-08	Yes	uOLED, LCD		2880x2720	1920×1920 (central focal area), 2880x2720 (peripheral)	70 (central display), 30 (peripheral display)	9:10	60 Hz (central display); 90 Hz (peripheral display)	115º		2x DisplayPort 1.2; 2x USB-A 3.0	558 g	$3195 (headset only, mandatory support license)	No	Yes	No	No	Yes	No	No	No	Hand tracking (Ultraleap), eye tracking			Yes
PlayStation VR2	2023-02-22	Yes	OLED	N/A	2000x2040			50:51	90 Hz 120 Hz	110°	Headphone jack			$549.99	No	Yes	No	Yes	Yes	No	No	No	HDR* 6DoF dual controllers Adaptive triggers Haptic feedback Finger touch detection Eye tracking* Vibration on headset* (*)Only supported on PlayStation 5			Yes
Modal VR	2016 (Announced)																					No				Yes
Samsung Gear VR	2015-11-01	No	Super AMOLED**		1280x1440**			8:9		96º				Discontinued ($99 at release)								No			Oculus Mobile	No
Avegant Glyph	2016				1280×720			16:9					434 g									No				No
Pico VR Goblin	2016	No			1280x1440		14.22	8:9	70 Hz	90º				Discontinued $269								No		Snapdragon 820	Own platform	No
Qualcomm Snapdragon VR820	2016-09-01	Inside-out			1440x1440			1:1	70 Hz													No		Snapdragon 820	Google Daydream	No
Alcatel Vision	2016-09-01				1080x1020			18:17														No			Google Daydream	No
Microsoft Hololens	2016-10-12	Inside-out											579 g	$3000 (developers) $5000 (enterprise)								No	AR. Gesture commands.	Intel 32-bit (1 GHz)	Windows MR	Optional
HELMET VISION	2016-11-02	Yes	8" OLED		1920×1200		16	16:10		120° Horizontal				$549								No	Panoramic lens, 6DoF controller, built-in headphones	Intel Atom x5-Z8300 Processor Quad core 1.44-1.84 GHz	Windows MR	No
Pico Neo CV	2017-01-01	Yes			1280×1080		14.70	1:1	90 Hz	102º			362 g	$239 (Lite) $540 (Standard)								No		Snapdragon 820	Own platform	No
Qualcomm Snapdragon 835 VRDK	2017-02-01	Inside-out			1440x1440			1:1	70 Hz													No		Snapdragon 835	Google Daydream	No
Woxter Neo VR100	2017-8?	No			960×1080			8:9						Discontinued ($180 at release)								No		Octacore 2 GHz	Android / Google Play	No
HTC Vive Focus	2018-1 (initially only in China)	Inside-out	AMOLED		1440x1600		13.09	9:10	75 Hz	110º				$599								No	3DoF controller	Snapdragon 835	VivePort	No
Oculus Go	2018-05-01	No	LCD		1280x1440		12.8	8:9	72 Hz 60 Hz	100º (estimate)			467 g	Discontinued ($199 – €219 (32 GB version) at release)								No	3DoF controller Built-in speakers	Snapdragon 821	Oculus Mobile	No
Lenovo Mirage Solo	2018-05-05	Inside-out	LCD		1280x1440		11.63	8:9	75 Hz	110º			645 g	€399								No	3DoF controller	Snapdragon 835	Google Daydream	No
GFL Developer Kit	2018-05-24	Inside-out markerless (Lighthouse)	OLED		1280x1440		11.63	16:9		110º												No		Nvidia Jetson TX2	Google Daydream and SteamVR	No
Google Daydream View	2018-10-17	No	Mobile Screen		Depends on device			Depends on device	Depends on device	100º			261 g	Discontinued								No	3 DoF Controller		Google Daydream	No
Pico G2 4K	2019-03-27	No	LCD		1920x2160			8:9	75 Hz	101º			278 g (goggle only) 470 g (goggle+battery)	$300 (32 GB base version) $350 (128 GB S version)								No	3DoF	Snapdragon 835	Pico Store + VivePort	No
Oculus Quest	2019-05-21	Inside-out	OLED		1440x1600		14.4	9:10	72 Hz	94º			571 g	Discontinued ($399 (64 GB version), $499 (128 GB version) at release)								No	6DoF dual controllers tracked by HMD, Hand Tracking (Beta)	Snapdragon 835	Oculus Mobile	Optional
Oculus Quest 2	2020-10-13	Inside-out	LCD		1832x1920		20.58	N/A	120 Hz 90 Hz 72 Hz 60 Hz	89°			503 g	$299 (64 GB) (Discontinued) $399 (128 GB) $499 (256 GB)								No	6DoF dual controllers tracked by HMD, Hand Tracking (Beta)	Snapdragon XR2	Oculus Mobile	Optional
HTC Vive Focus 3	2021-06-27	Inside-out	LCD		2448x2448		20.4	1:1	90 Hz	120°			785 g	$1300								No	6DoF controller, Removable and swappable battery	Snapdragon XR2	VIVE Reality System 2.0 (Android)	No
Pico Neo 3 Pro	2021-10-01	Inside-out	LCD		1832x1920			N/A	90 Hz	98º			395 g (without headstrap)	€599								No	6DoF hand tracking dual controllers, 3K	Snapdragon XR2	Own platform	No
HTC Vive Flow	2022-03-01	Inside-out	LCD		1600x1600		N/A	N/A	75 Hz	100º			189 g	$499								No	uses phone as controller	Snapdragon XR1	VIVE Reality System 2.0 (Android)	No
Lenovo ThinkReality VRX	2022-09-28 (announced)	Inside-out			2280 x 2280				70 Hz 90 Hz	95º												No				No
PICO 4	2022-10-18	Inside-out	LCD		2160x2160		20.6	1:1	72 Hz 90 Hz	105°			586 g	€430 (128 GB) €500 (256 GB)								No	6DoF dual controllers tracked by HMD	Snapdragon XR2	Own platform	No
Meta Quest Pro	2022-10-25	Inside-out	Mini-LED		1800×1920				72 Hz 90 Hz	106º Horizontal 96º Vertical			722 g	$999								No	Eye tracking, Face tracking, Mouth tracking, Standalone compute unit, Self tracking controller	Qualcomm Snapdragon XR2+	Oculus Mobile	Optional
HTC VIVE XR Elite	2023-2-25	Inside-out	LCD		1920 x 1920		17:5	N/A	90 Hz	110°			270 g (goggle only) 625 g (goggle+battery)	$1,099								No		Qualcomm Snapdragon XR2	Own platform	No
Bigscreen Beyond	2023-09-07	Yes	OLED		2560 x 2560		32	1:1	75 Hz/90 Hz	102° Horizontal 90° Vertical		1x DisplayPort 1.4; 2x USB 3.0	127 g	$999	No	Yes	No	No	Yes	No	No	No	Valve Index Controllers (6DoF with finger tracking)			Yes
Meta Quest 3	2023-10-10	Inside-Out	LCD		2064 x 2208		25	N/A	90 Hz/120 Hz	110° Horizontal 96° Vertical			515 g	$499								No		Snapdragon XR2 Gen 2	Oculus Mobile	Optional
Varjo XR4	2023-11-27	Inside-Out	mini-LED	Dual	3840x3744		51	16:9	90 Hz	120°(Horizontal) 105°(Vertical)	Built-in DTS 3D spatial audio with noise-canceling mics and integrated speakers	1 x DisplayPort 1.4 1 x 10 Gbit/s USB-C 3.1 Gen 2 or USB-C 3.2 Gen 2	665 g + headband 356 g	Superlative：3990 €/$ Focal Edition：9,990 €/$	No	Yes	No	No	Yes	No	No	No	ART and OptiTrack，6DoF，Autofocus，Eye tracking，LiDAR			Yes
Apple Vision Pro	2024-2-2	Inside-Out	OLED		3680x3140 (estimated based on 23 million pixels and 7:6 aspect ratio)		34		90 Hz/ 96 Hz/ 100 Hz	100° Horizontal	Surround sound speakers, 6 beamforming microphones	Wi‑Fi 6 (802.11ax), Bluetooth 5.3, Lightning connector	About 453 g to 680 g	$3,499								Yes	Hand tracking, Eye tracking, External display, LiDAR scanner, 3D camera	Apple M2 and R1	visionOS	Optional
Samsung Galaxy XR	2025-10-21	Inside-Out	OLED		3552x3840				90 Hz	109°(Horizontal) 100°(Vertical)	Two, 2 Way speaker (Woofer + Tweeter)	Wi-Fi 7 (802.11a/b/g/n/ac/ax/be) Bluetooth 5.4 (Up to)	1.20 lb (w/ forehead cushion) Weight may vary depending on whether light shield is attached or not. Separate battery weighs 0.67 lb	$1,799.99									Integrated AI	Snapdragon® XR2+ Gen 2 Platform	Android	Optional
Name	Release date (Y-M-D)	Positional tracking	Display type	Display (other)	Max. Resolution (per eye)	Resolution (per eye, region specific)	PPD	Aspect Ratio (per eye)	Refresh rate	Field of view	Audio	Connectivity	Weight	Price	OSVR	SteamVR	Oculus PC	PlayStation	PC	Windows MR	Oculus Store	App Store (Apple)	Other	Processor	Platform	Tethered

* Including price of VR touch peripherals.

=== Cancelled tethered VR headsets ===
Name	Positional tracking	Display	Resolution (per eye)	PPD	Aspect Ratio (per eye)	Refresh rate	Field of view	Audio	Connectivity	Weight	Price	Platform	Other
LG SteamVR Headset	Yes	OLED	1440x1280	13.09	45:20	90 Hz	110º					SteamVR	6DoF dual controllers Put on hold indefinitely

=== Cancelled standalone devices ===
Name	Positional tracking	Display	Resolution (per eye)	PPD	Aspect Ratio (per eye)	Refresh rate	Field of view	Audio	On-board processor	Weight	Price	Platform	Other
HTC Daydream Standalone	Inside-out								Snapdragon 835			Google Daydream	
DecaGear 1	Inside-out (4 cameras)	LCD	2160x2160	18.95	1:1	90 Hz	114º	In-strap speakers, dual microphones	Qualcomm Snapdragon XR2		$449	SteamVR	6DoF dual controllers tracked by HMD; Finger tracking Face/eye tracking, Adaptive triggers, Hip-navigation, Fingerprint sensor

== Extensive comparison of popular PC-based devices ==
The following tables compare general and technical information for a selection of popular retail head-mounted displays. See the individual display's articles for further information. Please note that the following table may be missing some information.

=== Optics and audio ===
Device	Rift	Vive	OSVR	HELMET VISION
Display technology	OLED	OLED	OLED	OLED
Resolution	1080 × 1200 per eye	1080 × 1200 per eye	960 × 1080 per eye	1920 × 1200
Display elements	2	2	1	1
Optical design	Fresnel/Traditional (Hybrid)	Fresnel/Traditional (Hybrid)	Dual aspheric lens	Panoramic lens
Total resolution	2160×1200	2160×1200	1920×1080	1920×1200
Native display refresh rate	90 Hz	90 Hz	60 Hz	60 Hz
Frame interpolation	Asynchronous; Timewarp	Automatic Interleaved; Reprojection	Asynchronous; Timewarp	Automatic Interleaved
Field of view	80°h x 90°v	105°h x 105°v	100°	120°
Audio technology	USB DAC with built-in headphones (no 3.5 mm jack)	USB DAC with 3.5 mm jack	USB DAC with 3.5 mm jack	Built-in headphones (Stereo sound)

=== Tracking ===
Device	Rift	Vive	OSVR	Rift S	Quest
Tracking technology	Camera-based with constellation	Scanning laser with photodiodes	Camera-based with constellation	Camera-Based, Insight Tracking	Camera-Based, Insight Tracking
Tracking device	IR camera	2x "Lighthouse" IR laser emitters	IR camera	5 x Cameras	4 x Cameras
Tracking device connectivity	USB 3.0	Power Only (+ Wireless link between emitters)	USB 2.0	USB 3.0 Built In	Built In
Positional tracking area	TBD	4.5m x 4.5m	TBD	?	?
Directional tracking	6DOF	6DOF	6DOF (facing camera)	6DOF Inside-Out	6DOF Inside-Out

=== Other information ===
Device	Rift	Vive	OSVR 1.4	HELMET VISION
Additional optional ports for accessories/expansion		1 × USB 3.0 1 × 3.5 mm audio jack for headphones	1 × USB 3.0 (external) 2 × USB 2.0 (internal)	3 × USB 3.0
Included input device(s)	Oculus Remote	2 × SteamVR controllers with 6DOF tracking	None	HELMET VISION Controller with 6DOF tracking
Optional input device (in addition to traditional PC input devices)	Oculus Touch controllers with 6DOF tracking (using included extra optical camera) available December 6, 2016, price $199	Vive Trackers for tracking real world objects and also for body tracking	None	None
Safety features	Guardian system using play area boundary and constellation cameras	Chaperone system using play area boundary and front-facing camera	None Announced	None Announced
Additional features		Bluetooth connectivity (in Vive link Box) for communication and calling.	None	Wifi & Bluetooth connectivity for communication

== VR support in game engines ==
Video Game Engines with VR support
Platform	Unity	Unreal Engine	CryEngine	Godot	Platform-specific SDK
SteamVR	Yes	Yes	Yes, CryEngine V	Yes	
Oculus PC (Rift and Rift S)	Yes	Yes	Yes	Yes	Oculus PC SDK
Oculus Mobile	Yes	Yes	Yes	Yes	Oculus Mobile SDK
Windows Mixed Reality	Yes, Unity 2017.2 and later	Yes, Unreal Engine 4 and later	Yes, CryEngine	Unknown	
Open Source Virtual Reality	Yes	Yes	Yes	Yes, via OpenHMD	OSVR SDK
