= ArtPassport =

- Key people: Tristram Fetherstonhaugh; Patrick Fetherstonhaugh
- Owner: GalleriesNow Limited
- Website: www.galleriesnow.net/artpassport-app/

ArtPassport is a free app for iOS. It provides 360° views of art exhibitions and can be connected to a virtual reality headset. It was chosen by TIME as one of the best 25 apps in the first five months of 2017, and was nominated for a Webby Award in 2018. The developers claimed that the app was downloaded 25,000 times in its first week on the App Store, where it received a rating of 2.5 stars out of 5.
