= Huawei VR Glass =

- Developer: Huawei
- Manufacturer: Huawei
- Type: Virtual reality headset
- Operating system: Windows

Huawei VR Glass is a brand of virtual reality headsets by Huawei. It consists of the Huawei VR Glass and the upcoming Huawei VR Glass 6DoF.
