= Pimax =

Chinese virtual reality company

Pimax Innovation Inc.
- Industry: Virtual reality
- Founded: November 2015; 10 years ago in Shanghai, China
- Founder: Zhibin "Robin" Weng
- Headquarters: Shanghai, China
- Area served: Worldwide
- Key people: Kevin Henderson (COO)
- Products: Pimax 4K; Pimax 8K; Pimax 5K PLUS; Pimax 5K XR; Pimax Vision 8K XR; Pimax Vision 8K PLUS; Pimax Artisan; Pimax Crystal; Pimax Crystal Light; Pimax Crystal Super; Pimax Sword Sense Controller; Pimax Dream Air; Pimax Portal; Pimax Portal Retro; Pimax Portal OLED
- Website: www.pimax.com

Pimax Innovation Inc. is a technology company specializing in virtual reality hardware products.

Pimax Technology was founded in November 2015. In 2016 its first product, the Pimax 4K virtual reality headset, was released, becoming the first commercially available headset with a combined (left + right eye) 4K resolution. The Pimax 4K virtual reality headset was recognized as the best VR product in Asia at CES 2016. In 2017, they ran a crowdfunding campaign on Kickstarter for the Pimax 8K headset, raising approximately $4.2 million, which held the Guinness World Record for the most successful crowdfunded VR project. On 19 December 2017, Pimax announced they had closed a $15 million series A funding round. On 8 January 2020, Pimax's flagship headset – the world's first dual native 4K consumer VR headset – Vision 8K X, featuring high resolution and ultra-wide field of view, 200°(D)/170°(H)/115°(V), was selected as Top Tech of CES: AR/VR by Digital Trends. On 18 October 2020, Pimax received $20M (USD) series B funding round, announced at World Conference on VR Industry (WCVRI) 2020.

== Products ==
=== Pimax Technology Portfolio ===
Pimax Technology LTD portfolio includes 15 patents, 6 trademarks and 9 software work certificates. In addition to the team's technical precipitation in the field of virtual reality and augmented reality technology and algorithm research for more than 10 years, it has maintained a position among VR headsets with high resolution for a long time.

=== Product comparison ===
Name	Release date	Resolution per eye	Resolution (total)	Screen	Price	Tethered	Standalone	Bandwidth per display	Upscaled	Refresh rate	Horizontal Field of view	Pixel density (ppd)	Lenses	Foveated Rendering	Headset passthrough	Eye tracking	Positional tracking	Inside-out tracking	Wireless transmission	Scent
Pimax 4K	2016	1920×2160	3840×2160	LCD		Yes	No		Yes	60 Hz	110°		53mm Aspherical				3DoF			
Pimax 5K PLUS	2018	2560×1440	5120×1440	LCD		Yes	No		No		140°			Yes			SteamVR positional tracking			
Pimax 5K XR	2018	2560×1440	5120×1440	OLED		Yes	No	2560×1440	No		140°			Yes			SteamVR positional tracking			
Pimax 5K SUPER	2020	2560×1440	5120×1440			Yes	No	2560×1440	No	120 Hz	160°			Yes			SteamVR positional tracking			
Pimax 8K	2019	3160×2160	6320×2160	LCD	699	Yes	No	2560×1440	Yes		160°			Yes		Add-on	SteamVR positional tracking	Add-on	Add-on	Add-on
Pimax Vision 8K X	2019	3840×2160	7680×2160			Yes	No	Display port 1.4a	No		160°			Yes		Add-on	SteamVR positional tracking	Add-on	Add-on	Add-on
Pimax Vision 8K PLUS	2019	3840×2160	7680×2160			Yes	No	1440p	Yes		160°			Yes		Add-on	SteamVR positional tracking	Add-on	Add-on	Add-on
Pimax Artisan	2020	3200×1440	7400×1440		449					120 Hz	140°			Yes						
Pimax Portal View	2023	1920×2160	3840×2160	LED	449	Yes	Yes			144 Hz	100°			Yes				Yes		
Pimax Portal QLED view	2023	1920×2160	3840×2160	QLED	599	Yes	Yes			144 Hz	100 °			Yes				Yes		
Pimax Crystal	2023	2880×2880	5760×2880	QLED	1599	Yes	Yes		No	120 Hz	105°	35	Optical aspheric glass	Yes		Motorized IPD adjustment,	Optional	Yes	WiGig 60Ghz optional (not yet released)	
Pimax Crystal Light	2024	2880×2880	5760×2880	QLED	799-899	Yes	No		No	120 Hz	105°	35	Optical aspheric glass	Yes		none	Optional	Yes		
Pimax Crystal Super	2024	3840×3840	7680×3840	QLED	1695	Yes	No		No	120 Hz	106°, 127°, 140°	57, 50, 35	Optical aspheric glass	Yes		Motorized IPD adjustment	Optional	Yes		
Pimax Crystal Super micro-OLED	2024	3840×3552	7680×3552	micro-OLED	1795	Yes	No		No	90 Hz	116°		Optical aspheric glass	Yes		Motorized IPD adjustment	Optional	Yes		
Pimax Dream Air	2025	3840×3552	7680×3552	micro-OLED	1899	Yes	No		No	90 Hz	110°		Optical aspheric glass	Yes		Tobii with motorized IPD adjustment	Optional	Yes		
Pimax Dream Air SE	2025	2560×2560	5120×2560	micro-OLED	899	Yes	No		No	90 Hz	105°		Optical aspheric glass	Yes		Tobii with motorized IPD adjustment	Optional	Yes		
Pimax Reality 12K QLED	No announced date (originally 2022)	6144×3456	12288×3456	QLED	2399	Yes	Yes		No	120 Hz	160°		57-72 mm aspheric glass	Yes	Yes	Tobii with motorized IPD adjustment	Optional	Yes	Wi-Fi 6E (WiGig 60Ghz optional)	

=== Kickstarter era ===
==== Pimax 4K ====
Released in 2016, the Pimax 4K was Pimax's first foray into the VR scene. It boasts a resolution of 1920×2160 per eye, for a combined total of 3840×2160 (thus the "4K" designation – though not full stereo 4K) running at a refresh rate of 60 Hz.

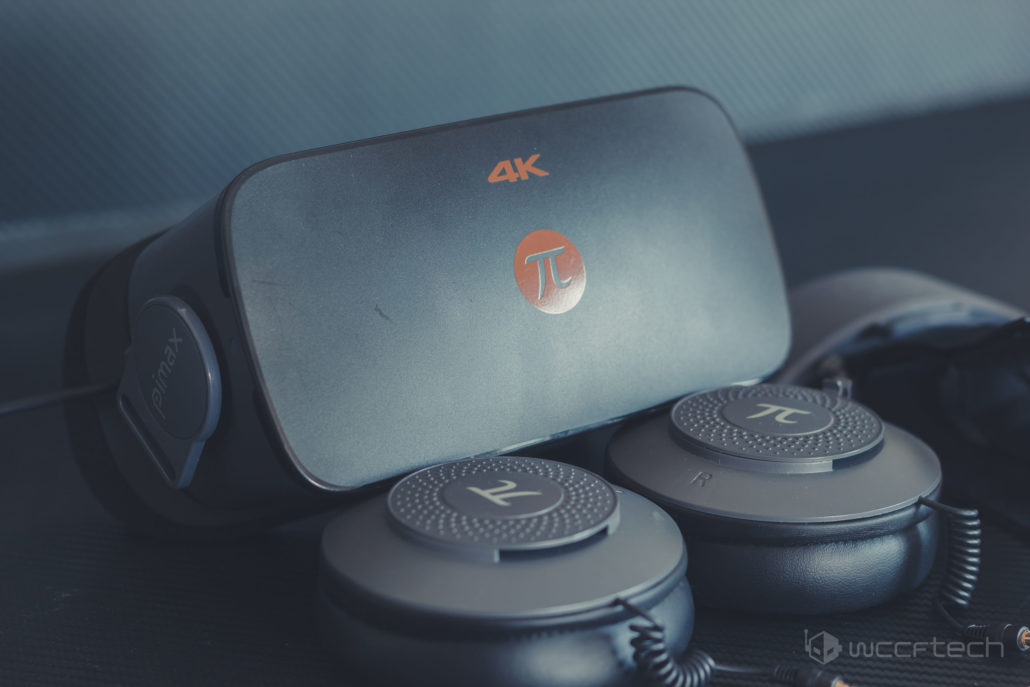
Pimax 4K Headset

==== Pimax 8K ====
The Pimax 8K is a virtual reality head-mounted display. It features two 4K displays, one for each eye, with an advertised field of view of 200 degrees. However, the Pimax 8K does not use the most common 8K resolution standard 8K UHD which contains four times as many pixels as 4K UHD. Since the Pimax 8K contains two 4K UHD displays, it only has half the number of pixels as that of 8K UHD. In addition, due to bandwidth limitations in the connection cable, the headset's input is limited to 2560×1440 for each of the displays. This is then upscaled in the device to the displays' actual resolution.

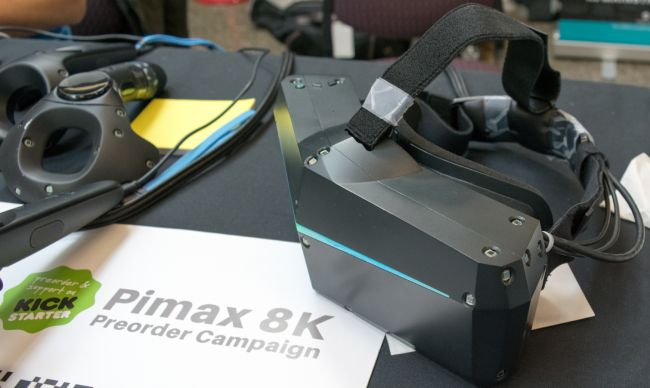
Pimax 8K prototype from Kickstarter campaign 2017

The company has announced that they are partnering with third parties to develop expansion modules for the headset. The expansion modules announced include features like inside-out tracking, eye tracking, wireless transmission, and scent.

At CES2019 in January 2019, Pimax disclosed strategic partnerships respectively with Leap Motion and 7INVENSUN on the development of hand motion tracking module and eye tracking module. Leap Motion was acquired by UltraHaptics in May 2019 and a new company called Ultraleap was established. On the 26th of February, Pimax signed an agreement to offer Ultraleap hand tracking for its whole VR headset range with specifications including a stereoscopic IR camera that creates an interaction zone of up to 100 centimeters (39 inches) range, extending from the device in a 160×160° field of view (approximately 74 cubic feet or 2.1 cubic meters of interactive space).

The headset uses the SteamVR positional tracking system (previously called "Lighthouse") initially developed for the HTC Vive by Valve. This means that existing Vive base stations and controllers are compatible with the Pimax headset, removing the need for existing Vive users to set up an additional tracking system or buy new controllers.

The headset is compatible with SteamVR and Oculus software, making it compatible with a wide range of already existing VR content. It is not a native SteamVR headset, and it requires "PiTool" software to be installed along with it. The project remains in the top 5 list of technology projects to this day and received the Guinness World Record for the most successful Speden-funded VR project.

The headset was initially planned to start shipping in January 2018, but was repeatedly delayed due to design tweaks and manufacturing refinements. As of July 2019 all backers with verified addresses had received their Pimax 8K and 5K+ headsets.

=== Commercial products ===
==== Pimax 5K PLUS ====
The Pimax 5K PLUS is based on similar hardware to the Pimax 8K, but features a lower resolution, at 2560×1440 displays per eye instead of 4K. Launched alongside the 8K, the 5K PLUS units began shipping in large numbers sooner; as of February 2019, a majority of backers had received their headsets, while leaving hundreds of Kickstarter backers waiting for their 8K unit.

==== Pimax 5K XR ====
5K XR is a virtual reality headset that is compatible with most VR software titles for Windows-based PC's. The headset has a resolution of 2560×1440 per eye or a total resolution of 5120×1440. The differentiating factor between the Pimax XR headset and the Pimax 5K PLUS is the XR utilizes OLED screens rather than LCD screens. The term "XR" stands for eXtended Range for the added dynamic color range and the near absolute blacks that are possible for OLED type screens.

==== Pimax 5K SUPER ====
The 5K SUPER has a standard refresh rate hitting 160 Hz and includes an experimental 180 Hz mode with user selectable refresh rates, fields of view, and 2560×1440 resolution.

==== Pimax Vision 8K X ====
The Pimax Vision 8K X is a variant of the Pimax 8K that solves the cable bandwidth limitation by using the highest data transmission mode with HBC with Displayport 1.4a, thus allowing native 4K resolution per eye, without the visual compromise from upscaling a 5K signal. The total native resolution of a Pimax Vision 8K X is 7680×2160, which should help reduce the screen-door effect. VISION 8KX offers a Dual Engine Mode, which can lower the render resolution to 2,560* 1,440 per display and then upscale that to 4K.

Pimax showcased its VISION 8K X at CES2020 as their flagship model and it was selected as the Top Tech of CES2020: AR/VR by Digital Trends after hands-on review at CES2020; "The Pimax has something most headsets lack; a real sense of peripheral vision."

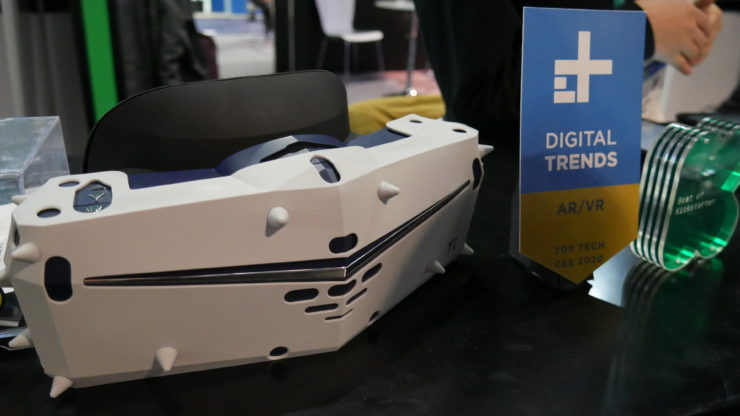
Pimax Vision 8KX selected by Digital Trends as Top Tech CES 2020

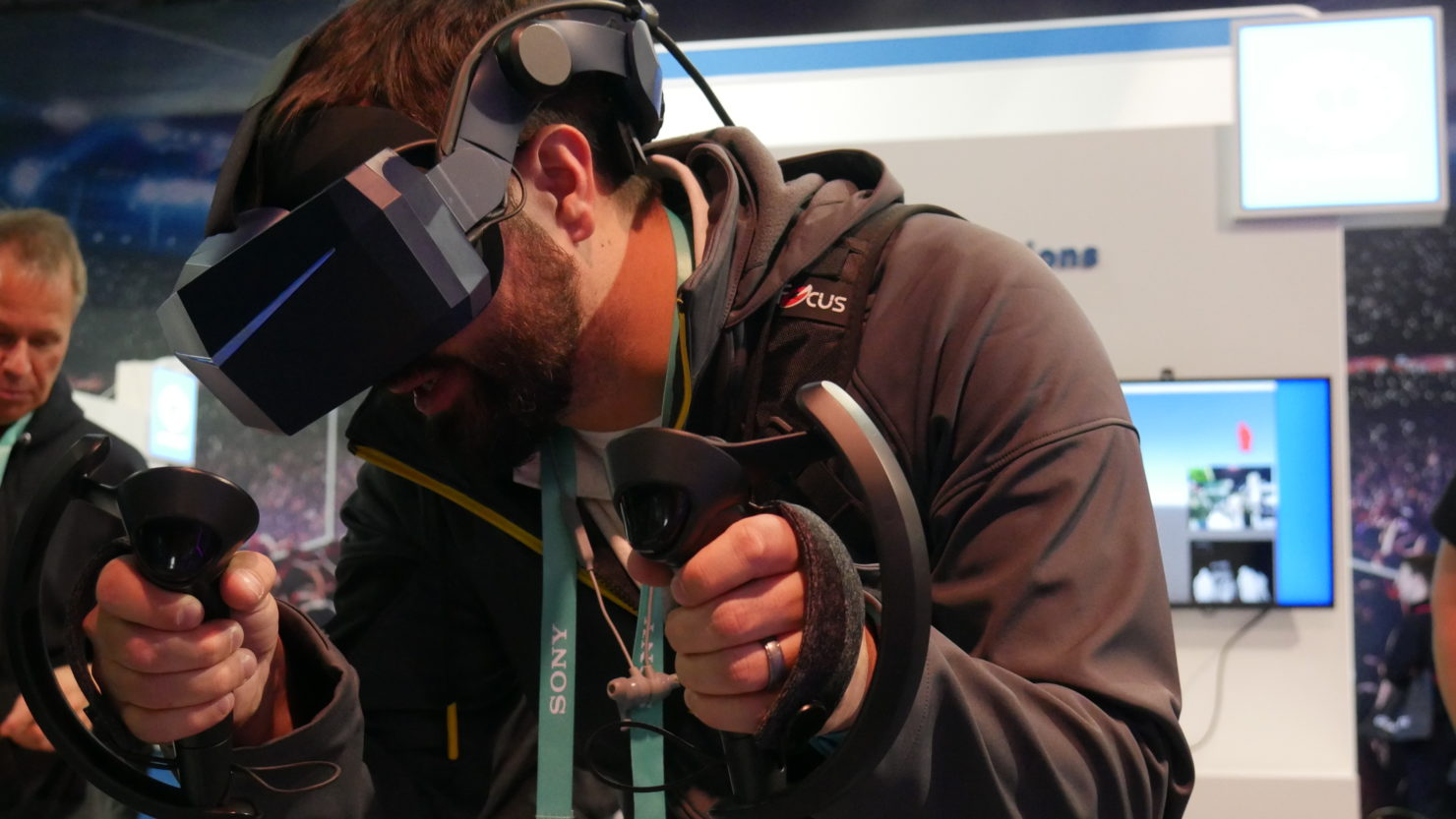
Experience with the Pimax Vision 8KX at CES 2020

Right after CES2020, the Pimax team went on to meetups in Orlando, Florida.

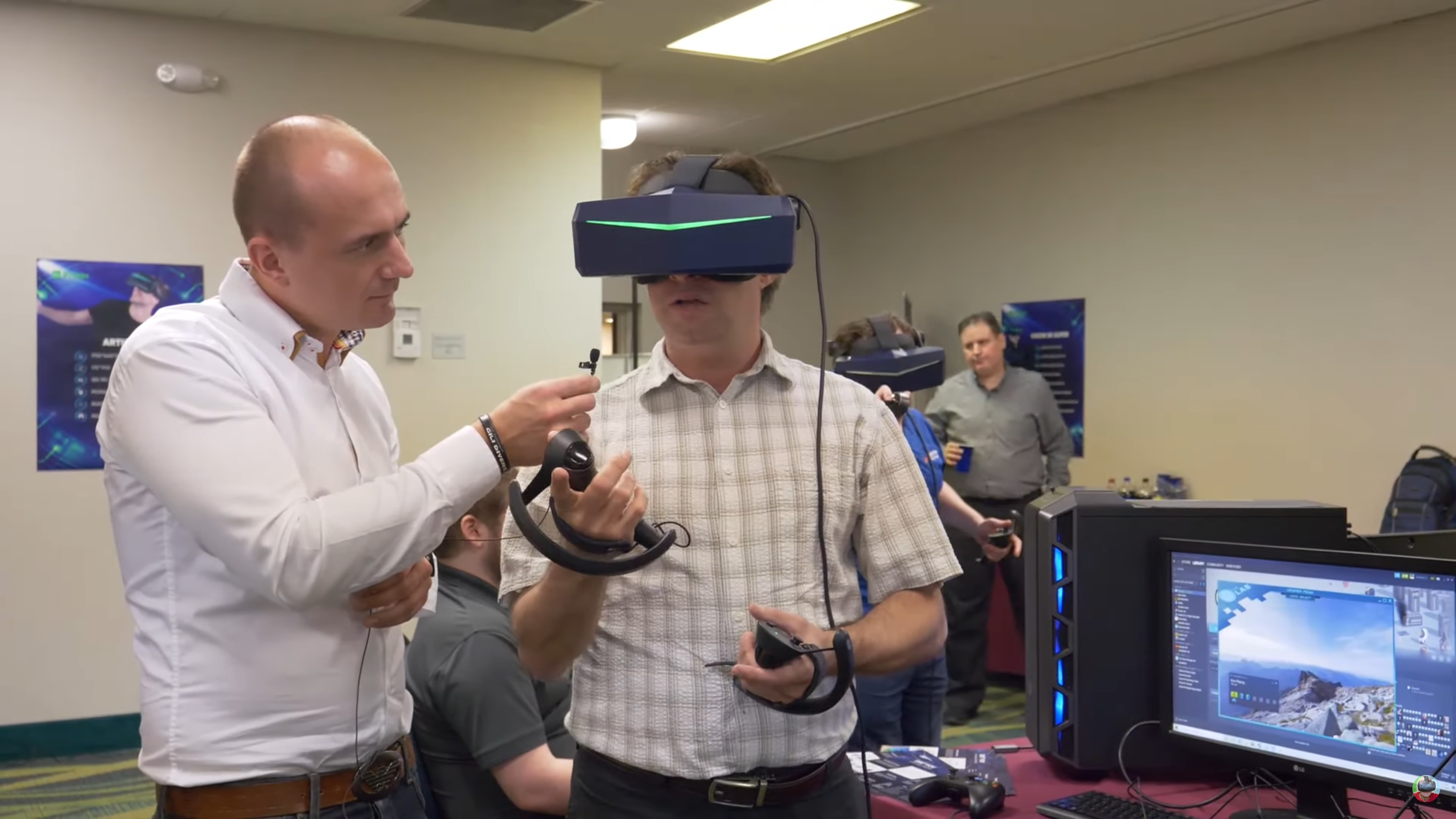
Pimax Roadshow 2020

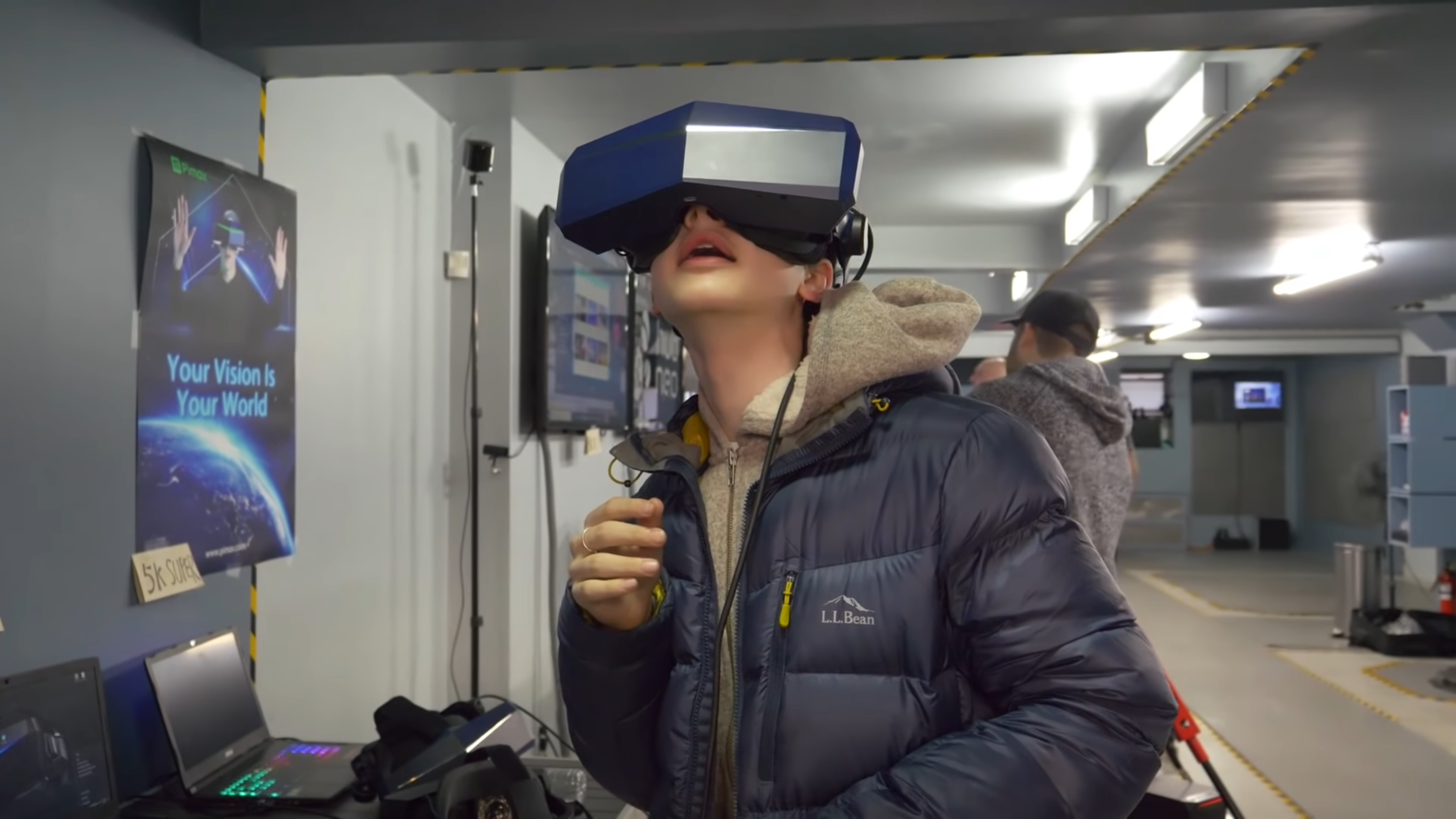
Demo session with 8KX

Pimax announced it had shipped all address verified 8KX orders on September 30, 2020.

==== Pimax Vision 8K PLUS ====
The Pimax Vision 8K PLUS is a headset similar to the Vision 8K X, but it takes a 1440p input which it upscales to the 4K panels.

==== Pimax Artisan ====
On December 16, 2019, Pimax published a teaser image of an unannounced headset called Artisan, touting 120 Hz refresh, 140º FOV, and 3200×1440 resolution, with its price only specified as "X49.00". During CES 2020, Pimax announced that the price of the Artisan will start at $449 for the base model. The device began shipping in April, 2020.

==== Pimax Portal ====
The Portal is a portable handheld gaming console that can slot into a VR headset. The Pimax Portal was announced on November 10, 2022, and launched on Kickstarter with 605 backers backing the campaign. The Portal was also shown at CES2023 with media labelling it the "Nintendo Switch of VR headsets".

==== Pimax Reality 12K QLED ====
The Pimax Reality 12K QLED is an unreleased next-generation virtual reality headset announced by Pimax on October 25, 2021. The headset is a hybrid standalone and can operate with or without a PC. It is expected to have 6144×3456 px displays and support a 200hz refresh rate and a 200-degree field of view. The headset will not require base stations but an optional faceplate that allows base station operation was announced. It includes an integrated WiFi 6E wireless radio and can attach an optional WiGig 60Ghz adapter. The device includes a Tobii eye tracking module with motorized IPD adjustment, interchangeable optical lenses, foveated rendering, and headset passthrough. It was expected to be released during Q4 of 2022 at an MSRP of $2399, but remains unreleased as of January 2026.

A version with a lower-resolution 6K display was released in May 2023 as the Pimax Crystal, and a trade-in program was announced in September 2023. At CES 2024, Pimax held a private demo of an engineering verification prototype. News updates published in 2024-2025 assert that the development of the 12K version continues, but key components, such as a high-resolution micro-OLED and QLED displays and DisplayPort 2.1 to MIPI Display Serial Interface bridge chips, are not yet available.

==== Pimax Crystal ====
The Pimax Crystal is a 6K virtual reality headset announced by Pimax on May 31, 2022 and released in May 2023. The headset is similar to the unreleased Pimax 12K QLED headset and is hybrid standalone that can operate with or without a PC. The announced specifications are 2880×2880 px displays with up to 160Hz refresh rate, up to a 140 degree diagonal field of view at a pixel density of 42ppd. The panels are QLED type and the lenses are interchangeable optical aspheric glass. The headset was announced to use inside-out tracking and optional lighthouse tracking. The headset has integrated Wi-Fi 6E wireless and an optional 60Ghz WiGig adapter. The headset also integrates eye tracking with a motorized automatic IPD adjustment capability. The Crystal headset was expected to have an MSRP of $1,899 but the final price was $1599.

==== Pimax Crystal Super ====
A 8K version with a choice of a 3840×3840 px QLED panel with 912-zone Mini-LED local dimming and interchangeable optical modules offering different field of view, or a 3840×3552 px micro-OLED display panel from Sony; weight reduced to under 1 kg (2.2 lb) due to elimitation of an embedded Snapdragon XR2 processor for the standalone mode; introduced in April 2024. In November 2024, previously announced MSRP of $1799 was reduced to $1695.

==== Pimax Crystal Light ====
A lighter 815 g (28.7 oz) version of the Pimax Crystal without battery, eye tracking nor standalone mode, and a choice of standard QLED display or QLED with local-dimming in the backlight; introduced in April 2024.

==== Pimax Dream Air ====
A lightweight 170 g (6.0 oz) PCVR headset with a DisplayPort interface, eye-tracking from Tobii and auto-IPD. 110° horizontal field of view, premium micro-OLED display with 3840 × 3552 pixels per eye and 90 Hz refresh rate. Introduced in December 2024.

==== Pimax Dream Air SE ====
A lighter 140 g (4.9 oz) version of Dream Air, differing by a micro-OLED display with 2560 × 2560 pixels per eye and 105° horizontal field of view. Introduced in May 2025.
