= Bigscreen Beyond =

Virtual reality headset

- Manufacturer: Bigscreen, Inc.
- Type: Virtual reality headset
- Released: 2023
- Introductory price: US$999 (headset only); US$1,580 (with base stations and Knuckles controllers)
- Discontinued: March 2025
- Display: Micro OLED 2560x2560 per eye @ 75hz or 90hz
- Connectivity: 2x USB-C 3.0, 1x DisplayPort 1.4
- Weight: 127 grams (4.5 oz)
- Successor: Bigscreen Beyond 2
- Website: Archived March 19, 2025, at the Wayback Machine

The Bigscreen Beyond is a virtual reality headset series developed by Bigscreen VR.

== Specifications ==
Compared to other headsets on the market, the Beyond is significantly smaller than many other headsets, even nearly fitting inside other VR headsets. The Beyond uses SteamVR outside-in tracking, and is tethered to a computer.

For each eye, there is a 1-inch 2560x2560 pixel micro OLED panel that can refresh at 75hz or 90hz. The device uses smaller pancake lenses, as opposed to Fresnel lenses. Additional magnetic lenses can snap on for people with prescription glasses.

Bigscreen 3D prints a custom washable facial mask using a 3D scan of the customer's face, which blocks all outside light. The interpupillary distance (IPD) between the displays is configured at the factory, and cannot be adjusted, which Bigscreen cites as being due to decreasing the weight. Because the device is tuned to a particular customer, the Beyond will not fit well on other peoples' faces. An imperfect fit will lead to "a major drop in visual quality".

At a MSRP of US$999, the Beyond does not come with SteamVR base stations or controllers. Two base stations and Knuckles controllers are an additional $580.

In March 2025, Bigscreen announced the Beyond 2, which added features such as an improved field of view, manual IPD adjustment, and an additional model known as the "2e" which adds eye tracking. Bigscreen also partnered with VRChat to release a special edition of the 2e, which features a translucent purple casing, and unlocks exclusive in-game stickers and profile badges.

== Reception ==
Road to VR, in a review, called it "the most interesting and promising new dedicated PC VR headset to come out in years", but criticized it for having no built-in audio. The Beyond is praised for its extremely light weight, at 127 grams (4.5 oz).

== See also ==
- Apple Vision Pro
- Samsung Galaxy XR
- Valve Index
