= Open Source Virtual Reality =

Open source software project

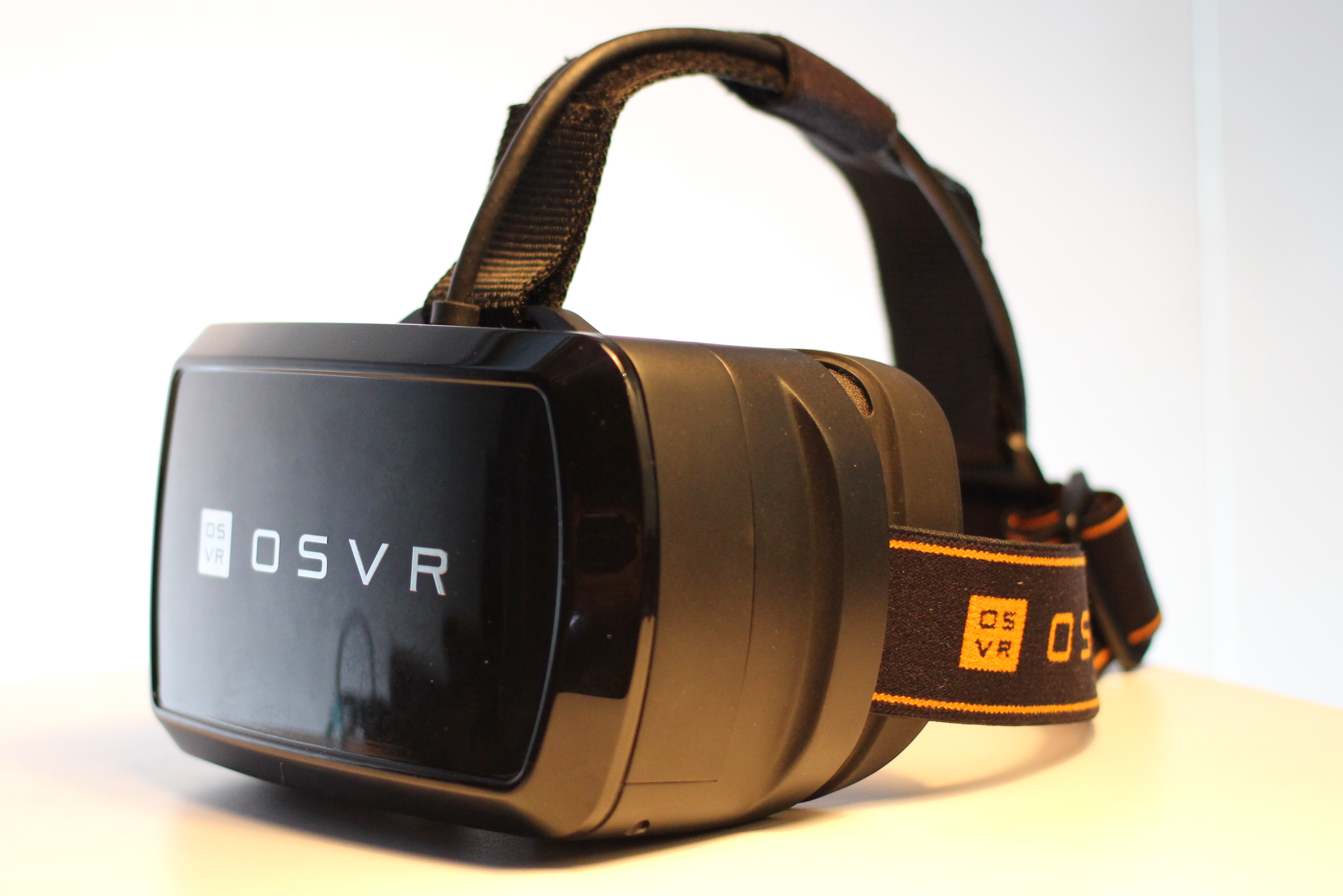
- OSVR Hacker Developer Kit 1.4
- Name: OSVR Hacker Developer Kit (HDK)
- Type: Virtual reality headset
- Manufacturer: Razer
- Designed by: Sensics and Razer
- Display Technology: OLED
- Resolution: 1200x1080 per eye
- Head Tracking: 6DOF (3-axis rotational tracking + 3-axis positional tracking)
- Platforms: Microsoft Windows, macOS, Android and Linux
- Connection: 2x USB 3.0, HDMI 1.4, Audio out
- Website: Official website

Open Source Virtual Reality (OSVR) is an open-source software project that aims to enable headsets and game controllers from all vendors to be used with any games developed by Razer and Sensics.

It is also a virtual reality headset that claims to be open-source hardware using the OSVR software.

== Project information ==
OSVR has two main and independent parts: open-source hardware and open-source software. The project is primarily sponsored by Razer and Sensics. Partners in the project include game developers Ubisoft and hardware manufacturers Vuzix. OSVR has requested help with creating Android Daydream VR Plugin.

The open source software platform allows virtual reality developers to detect, configure and operate virtual reality devices across a wide range of operating systems. It is provided under the Apache 2.0 license. Since August 2018, the electrical hardware source files are available. The files that have been released so far are under a proprietary, source-available license.

One of their most popular hardware consists of virtual reality headset called the Hacker Development Kit. The first model of the headset was introduced in January 2015 in CES. Shipping to select developers started in July 2015. Pre-ordering was opened to the general public by October and shipping started by November 2015.

== Games ==
Some of the games with the support of OSVR:

- Elite Dangerous
- Pollen
- Project CARS
- Redout
- The Vanishing of Ethan Carter VR
- VirtualRealPorn
- War Thunder

== See also ==
- OpenVR, a library with similar goals by Valve
- OpenXR, an open, royalty-free standard for access to virtual reality and augmented reality platforms and devices
