= Pollen (video game) =

2016 video game

- Developer: Mindfield Games
- Publisher: Mindfield Games
- Engine: Unity
- Platforms: Microsoft Windows, PlayStation 4
- Release: April 20, 2016
- Genre: Walking simulator
- Mode: Single-player

Pollen is a first-person sci-fi mystery walking simulator video game developed by Finnish company Mindfield Games for Microsoft Windows. Pollen is playable on regular monitors and Oculus Rift virtual reality headsets (beta), and will be playable on HTC Vive.

The game takes place in an alternate timeline of humanity's history, on a research base called Station M found on Saturn's largest moon Titan. The gameplay centers around semi-linear first-person exploration, allowing the player to discover the story through puzzles and interacting with the objects around them.

== Gameplay ==
In Pollen, the player assumes the role of a RAMA Industries employee, who is sent to Titan to replace a missing crew member on Station M. Just before entering the base the player loses all contact with the research team, and must enter the station in search of answers. The player will have to examine everything in their environment, listen to audio tapes, as well as solve puzzles to advance through the story. Station M contains several areas for the player to explore, including the landing pad, crew quarters, cargo bay, laboratory, comm station, and generator room.

== Setting ==
The game is set in an alternate reality where crewed exploration of the Solar System is happening at a rapid pace; however, computers are between 10 and 20 years behind what they are at the same time in our world. The point of divergence is in 1963, when John F. Kennedy survives an assassination attempt, and the U.S. and U.S.S.R. eventually ally. RAMA Industries is founded by the governments of several nations, becoming the dominant space company.

== Development ==
Pollen's development began in late 2013 with the Unity 4 engine, and the game was later ported to the Unity 5 engine. The development team consisted initially of 5 team members. The game was announced in Aug 2014 accompanied by a teaser trailer. In Oct 2015, the first gameplay trailer was released.

On October 5, 2015, Pollen was posted on Steam, and after getting 86% yes votes within 36 hours, it was Greenlit by the community two days later on 7 Oct, 2015., after receiving a significant amount of press coverage.
