= Sensics =

Virtual reality company

Sensics is an American company that made virtual reality products for professionals and consumers. Sensics was the co-founder of the OSVR ecosystem and technical lead of its software platform.

Sensics is headquartered in Columbia, Maryland. As of January 2025, Sensics' website is down. According to the Maryland Secretary of State, Sensics has been forfeited since 2019.

== History ==
The company's products are based on patented technology developed at Johns Hopkins University at the request of a major car company, starting in 1999. The need presented by this car company was to develop a head-mounted display that had both wide field of view and high resolution, so that a high level of immersion in the virtual world can be achieved. The application was car design, with a focus towards designing the interior of the car, and the thought was that a high-performance head mounted display can shorten the time it takes to bring a new model into market.

Wide field of view and high resolution initially seemed to be contradictory requirements: if a single display element is used, it needs to be magnified to show a wide field of view, but this same magnification reduces the pixel density and makes it seem of lower resolution. The solution was to optically tile multiple displays. Conceptually similar to how multiple desktop PCs can be networked together to form a powerful computer, the team realized the multiple micro-displays can be blended together into a display that has much higher resolution. The project was successful: a prototype model was indeed delivered to that company and was used in the design process of a major family sedan.

After completing this project, Dr. Larry Brown and Marc Shapiro, part of the team that developed this technology at Johns Hopkins University decided to start Sensics to commercialize this product signed a technology licensing deal with the university. The team was able to secure a Phase I and then Phase II SBIR grant from NASA, which allowed it to incubate the company, develop the technology and deliver a working product to NASA.

== Product evolution ==
=== 2006–2013: Professional-grade tiled display systems ===
In 2006 Sensics hired Yuval Boger as CEO to take the company's products to market.

The company's first commercial product, the piSight was launched in 2006. The initial piSight featured 24 micro-displays, 12 in each eye. Each micro-display was of SVGA resolution, and thus the initial product had nearly 6 million pixels per eye. This resulted in an overall field of view greater than 150 degrees. At the time, operating the piSight required an array of computers, which was required to generate the 24 SVGA signals. These computers had to be networked so that changes in the virtual scene could be synchronized.

While the 24-display piSight was sold towards several high-end uses, Sensics felt that it could offer tiled HMDs to customers that perhaps could not afford the high-end model. The company started offering many different models of its products, where the key difference was the number of micro-displays installed in each. For example, a model with 12 micro displays (6 per eye) could provide over 120 degree field of view, while requiring just 50% of the displays and computing power of the 24-display model. Because these models were quite similar, customers were able to upgrade from one model to a model with greater number of displays.

The early need to use multiple networked computer to drive the HMD was deemed to be a major issue for several customers that could not, or did not wish, to modify their application software to support such networked configuration. To overcome this limitation, Sensics introduced high-speed hardware capable of taking a single video signal and performing real-time splitting of this signal to the lower-resolution signals required by the micro-displays.

The company also introduced the xSight, an HMD with a ski-goggle design, to complement the "over the head" mounting of the earlier piSight.

=== 2010–present: Professional-grade Single-display HMDs ===
Sensics added a more traditional HMD, the zSight, to its product line. Like many other HMDs on the market, it uses a single display per eye. Though it does not provide a field of view that is as wide as the multi-display products, this design allows for a simpler, lower cost solution that as more portable and more power-efficient than its multi-display counterparts.

=== 2012–present: Emulated optical devices ===
These are devices such as virtual binoculars and virtual rifle sights. They are typically made by modifying a commercial field binocular or similar device and inserting a micro display, adapting optics and sometimes a motion tracker inside them. The result is a device that looks similar to the original field device but shows an image that is generated by a computer. This is typically used for training applications.

=== 2014–2019: Consumer products and the OSVR open-source initiative ===
Sensics collaborated with Razer Inc. in creating OSVR, an open-source ecosystem that includes both an open-source software platform as well as open-source HMD for VR. Sensics created the software architecture and designed key parts of the OSVR HMD, also known as a Hacker Development Kit (HDK)

Sensics personnel frequently deliver presentation on the OSVR architecture

=== 2019-present: Forfeiture ===
According to the Maryland Secretary of State, Sensics has not been allowed to legally operate since 2019.

== Products ==
The company's head mounted display products fall into four categories:

1. Open-source consumer products, through the OSVR initiative that Sensics co-founded.

2. Emulated optical devices which look and feel like actual binoculars, spotter scopes and other optical equipment, but have an embedded micro display in them that presents in image generated from a computer instead of an image out in the real world. Sensics published a white paper explaining the process by which these devices are built

3. Single-display professional products which employ a traditional approach of utilizing a single micro display (such as with 1280x1024 resolution) for each eye. An example of such a product is the zSight.

4. Tiled-display professional products which use a multi-lens system to blend together multiple micro-displays. This approach allows to create head mounted displays that have more pixels than products that use a single micro-display. This is conceptually similar to how individual computers can be connected together in the field of grid computing. For instance, several micro displays with 800x600 pixel resolution can be blended into a 1920x1080 image. An example of such a product is the xSight.

Sensics' products, as do other head-mounted displays, are typically used with peripherals such as those that perform motion tracking and eye tracking.

== Applications ==
The company's products are being used in various applications such as defense, automotive, and academic research.
