= Virtual reality headset =

Head-mounted device that provides virtual reality for the wearer

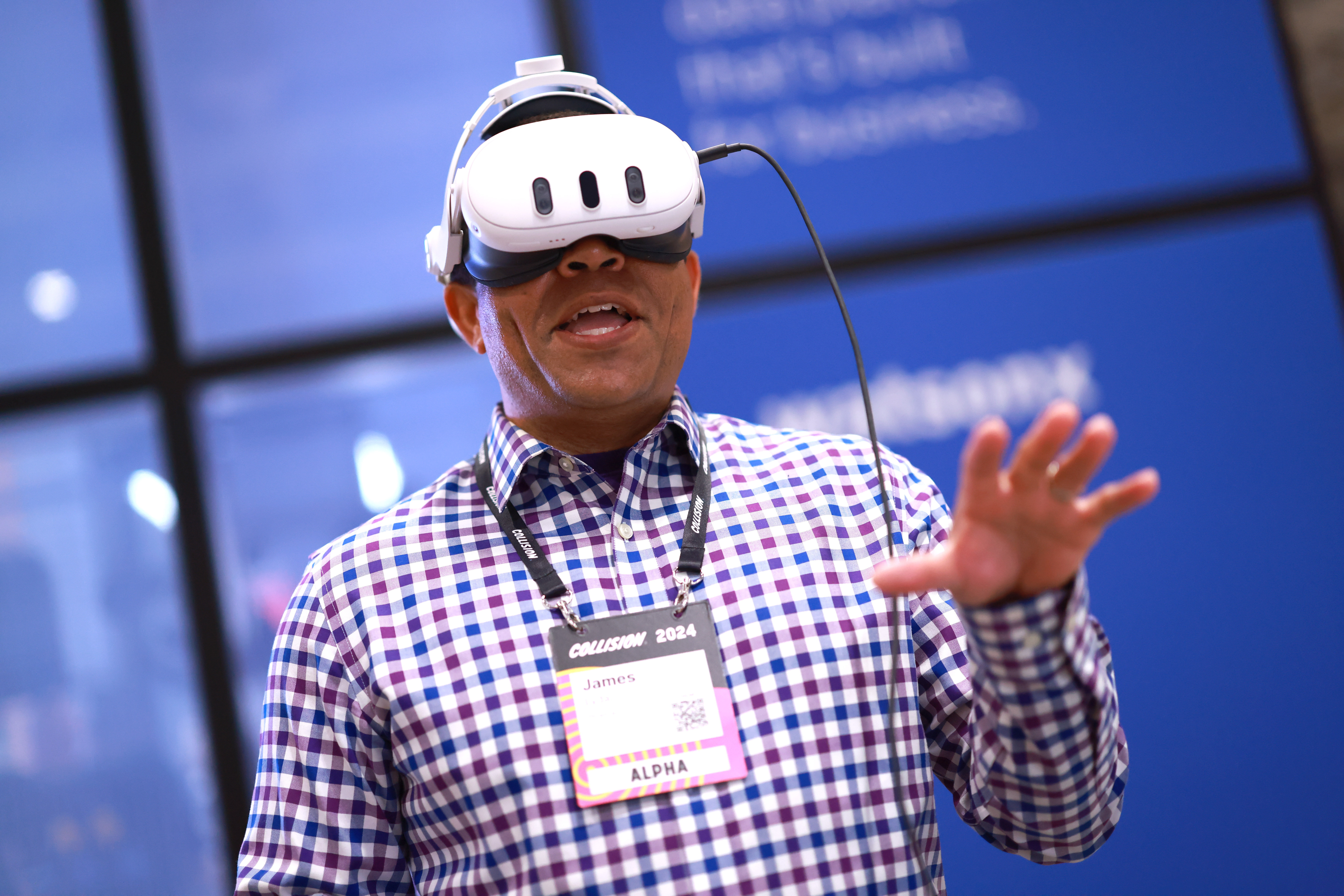
A man wearing a Meta Quest 3 virtual reality headset

A virtual reality headset (VR headset) is a head-mounted device that uses 3D near-eye displays and positional tracking to provide a virtual reality environment for the user. VR headsets are widely used with VR video games, but they are also used in other applications, including simulators and trainers. VR headsets typically include a stereoscopic display (providing separate images for each eye), stereo sound, and sensors like accelerometers and gyroscopes for tracking the pose of the user's head to match the orientation of the virtual camera with the user's eye positions in the real world. Mixed reality (MR) headsets are VR headsets that enable the user to see and interact with the outside world. Examples of MR headsets include the Apple Vision Pro and Meta Quest 3.

VR headsets typically use at least one MEMS IMU for three degrees of freedom (3DOF) motion tracking, and optionally more tracking technology for six degrees of freedom (6DOF) motion tracking. 6DOF devices typically use a sensor fusion algorithm to merge the data from the IMU and any other tracking sources, typically either one or more external sensors, or "inside-out" tracking using outward facing cameras embedded in the headset. The sensor fusion algorithms that are used are often variants of a Kalman filter. VR headsets can support motion controllers, which similarly combine inputs from accelerometers and gyroscopes with the headset's motion tracking system.

Most headsets are reliant on a personal computer to operate. Some "standalone" headsets are based on a mobile operating system and smartphone-like hardware, allowing VR apps to run directly on the device, while also allowing VR applications to be streamed from a PC over a USB or Wi-Fi connection. Virtual reality headsets and viewers have also been designed for smartphones, where the device's screen is viewed through lenses acting as a stereoscope, rather than using dedicated internal displays.

== History ==
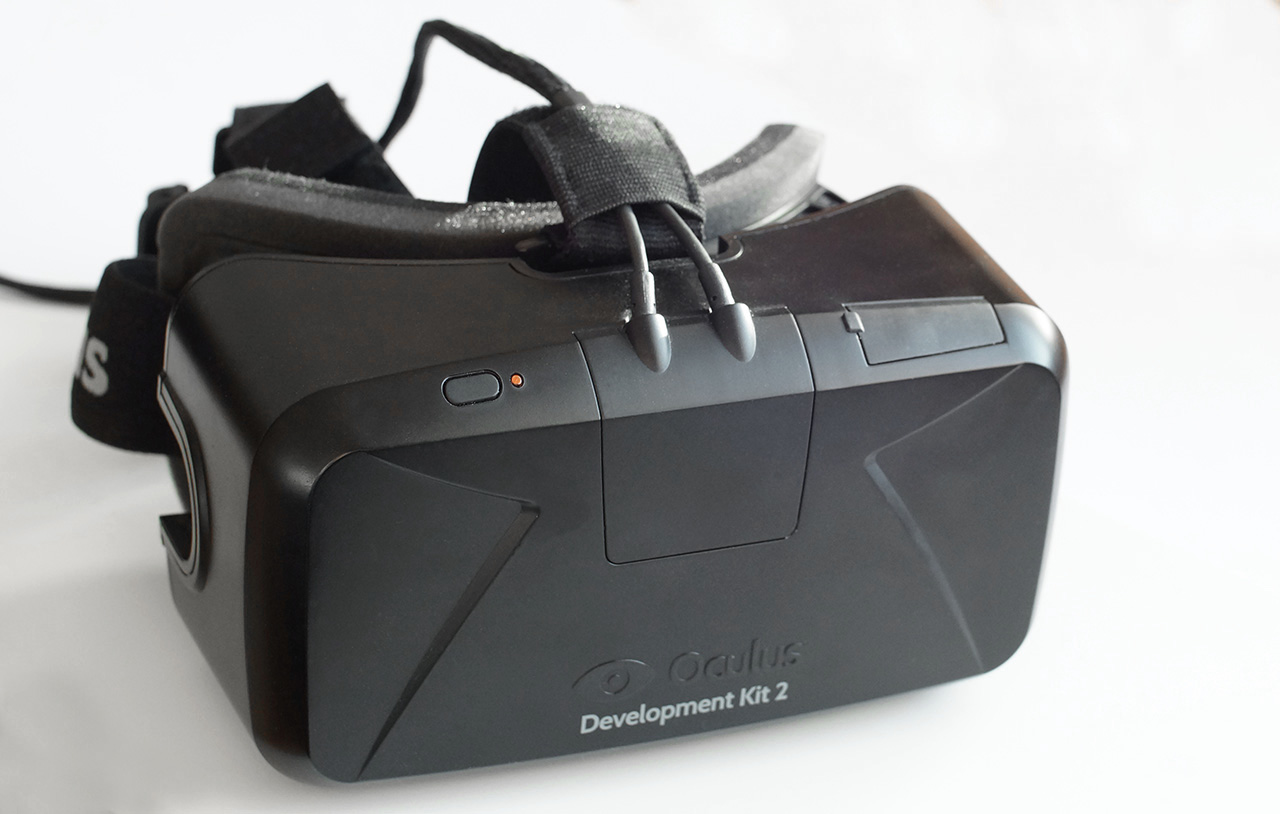
Oculus Rift DK2, one of the first popular VR headsets in the 2010s

VPL Research was a company that made early VR headsets in the 1980s.

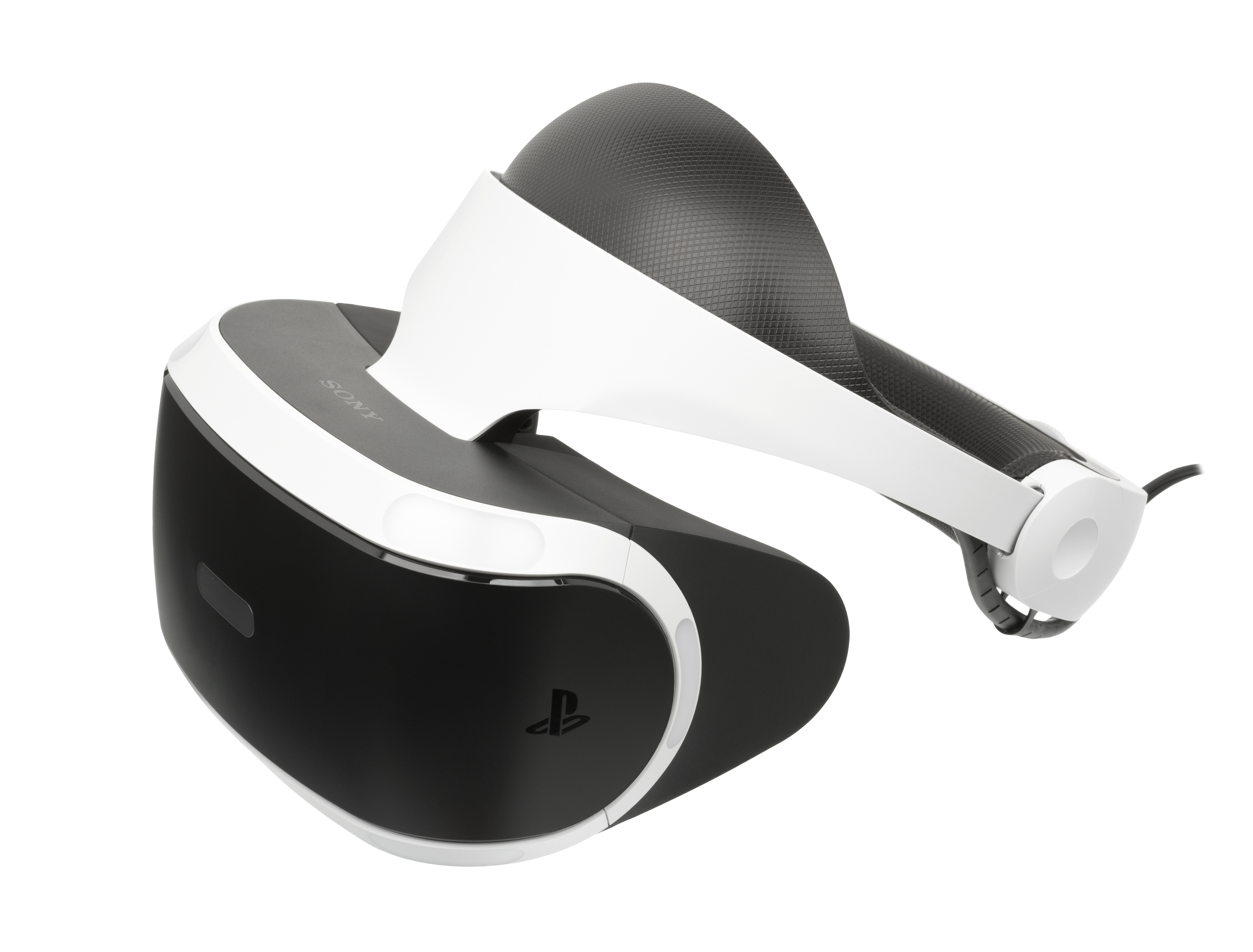
The PSVR headset for the PlayStation 4 video game console, released in 2016

The Sega VR was announced in 1991 and seen in early 1993 at the Winter CES. It was never released for consoles, but was utilized for the Sega VR-1 motion simulator arcade attraction in 1994. Another early VR headset, the Forte VFX1, was announced at CES in 1994. The VFX-1 has stereoscopic displays, 3-axis head-tracking, and stereo headphones.

Sony released the Glasstron in 1997, which has an optional positional sensor, allowing the wearer to view the surroundings, with the perspective moving as the user's head moves, giving a deep sense of immersion. These VR headsets gave MechWarrior 2 players a new visual perspective of seeing the battlefield from inside the cockpit of their craft. However, these early headsets failed commercially due to their limited technology, and they were described by John Carmack as like "looking through toilet paper tubes".

In 2012, a crowdfunding campaign began for the Oculus Rift, a virtual reality headset created by Palmer Luckey; the project was promoted by several prominent video game developers, including John Carmack who later became Oculus VR's CTO. In March 2014, the project's parent company Oculus VR was acquired by Facebook for $2 billion. The final consumer-oriented release of Oculus Rift began shipping on 28 March 2016.

In March 2014, Sony demonstrated a prototype headset for PlayStation 4, which was later named PlayStation VR. In 2014, Valve demonstrated some headset prototypes, which led to a partnership with HTC to produce the Vive, which focuses on "room-scale" VR environments that users can naturally navigate within and interact with. The headset uses Valve's "SteamVR" software platform. The Vive was released in April 2016 and PlayStation VR in October 2016. The PlayStation VR was succeeded by the PlayStation VR2 in February 2026.

Google released a series of specifications and associated DIY kits for virtual reality viewers known as Google Cardboard; these viewers are capable of being constructed using low-cost materials (and a smartphone with a gyroscope), such as cardboard (hence the naming). Samsung Electronics partnered with Oculus VR to co-develop the Samsung Gear VR (which is only compatible with some Samsung Galaxy devices). LG Electronics developed a headset with dedicated displays for its LG G5 smartphone known as LG 360 VR. In March 2017, Microsoft launched a platform for VR and mixed reality headsets running on Windows 10 known as Windows Mixed Reality, with VR headsets from multiple partners including PC makers Acer, Dell, HP Inc., and Lenovo.

In 2018, Oculus released the Oculus Go, a standalone headset capable of running VR apps on embedded mobile computing hardware, thus not needing a PC or an inserted smartphone to operate. In June 2019, Valve released their own in-house SteamVR headset, the Valve Index. In an October 2019 report, Sony, Meta (Oculus), and HTC were identified by Trend Force as the three largest manufacturers of VR hardware. 2019 saw Meta release the first-generation Oculus Quest, a successor to the Oculus Go concept which supports motion controllers and positional tracking with 6DOF. Subsequent releases of the Quest line included the Quest 2 (September 2020), Quest 3 (October 2023) and Quest 3S(October 2024).

In May 2021 Pico Immersive released the Pico Neo 3, targeting enterprise, commercial, and professional applications. It was succeeded by the Pico 4 in October 2022, and the PICO 4 Ultra in 2024.

In 2023 Bigscreen VR released the Bigscreen Beyond, which was succeeded by the Bigscreen Beyond 2 in March 2025.

Apple released the Vision Pro in February 2024, advertising it as a spatial computer for productivity.

Samsung released the Galaxy XR on in October 2025. It is the first headset to use Googles Android XR Operating system.

In November 2025 Valve announced the Steam Frame, which markets itself as a streaming first headset for VR and non-VR games, with standalone capabilities. It was released in September 2026.

== Technology ==
=== Resolution and display quality ===
There are different optics and visual qualities that affect how an individual perceives the image quality and how they experience the virtual world. The image clarity depends on the display resolution, optic quality, refresh rate, and field of view.

Because virtual reality headsets stretch a single display across a wide field of view (up to 110° for some devices according to manufacturers), the magnification factor makes flaws in display technology much more apparent. One issue is the so-called screen-door effect, where the gaps between rows and columns of pixels become visible, akin to looking through a screen door. This was especially noticeable in earlier prototypes and development kits, which had lower resolutions than the retail versions.

Retina E-paper is a new technique that has been demonstrated. Based on electrochemically tunable WO₃ nanodisks, this display achieves pixel dimensions around 560 nm and a resolution exceeding 25,000 pixels per inch, approaching the limit of human visual acuity. Unlike conventional emissive micro-LED or OLED displays, Retina E-paper is low power and uses ambient light, making it a promising candidate for future VR / AR headsets.

=== Optics ===
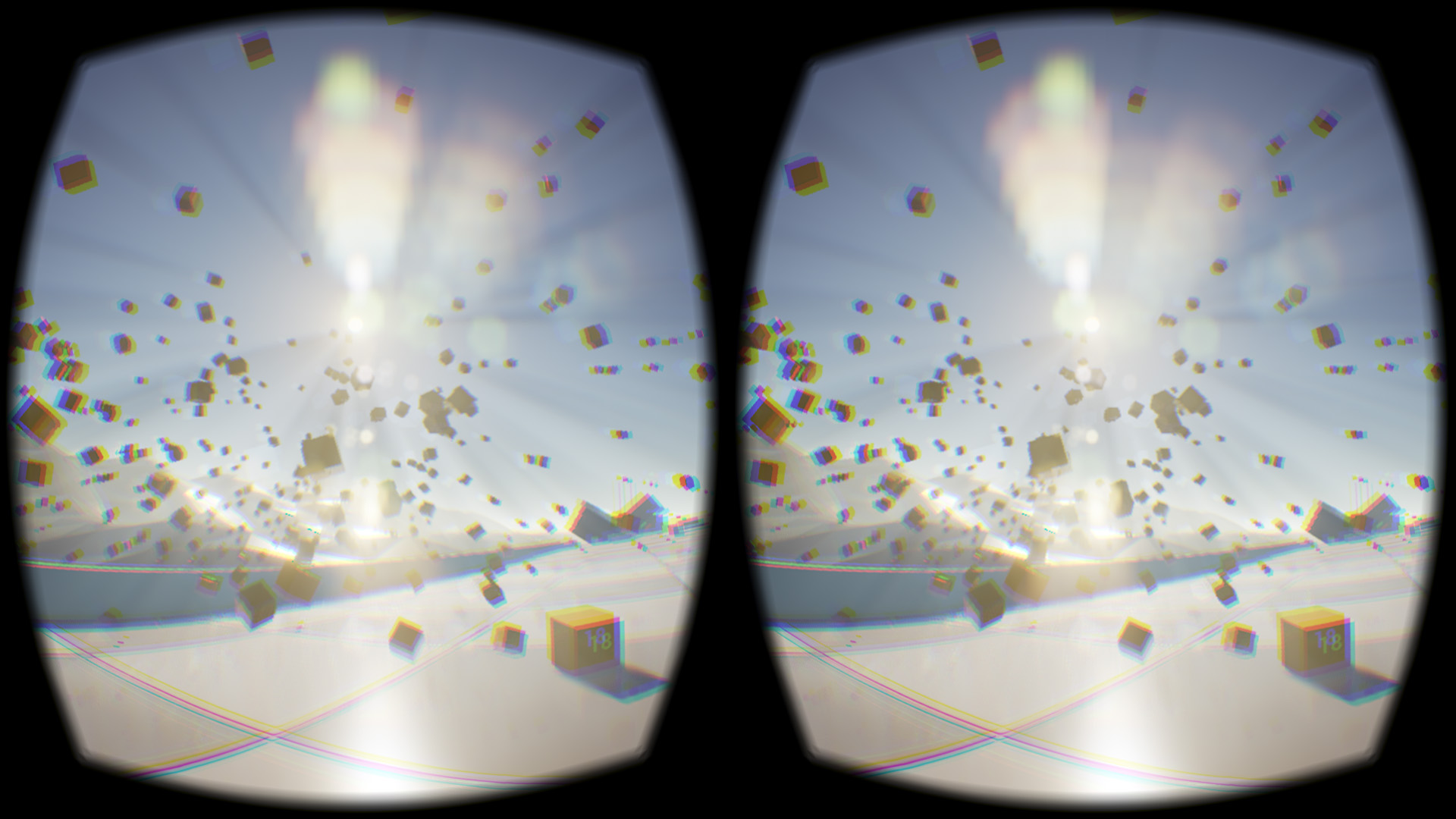
An image displayed by a VR headset, showing compensation for lens distortion and chromatic aberration

The lenses of the headset are responsible for mapping the up-close display to a wide field of view, while also providing a more comfortable distant point of focus. One challenge with this is providing consistency of focus: because eyes are free to turn within the headset, it is important to avoid having to refocus to prevent eye strain.

Fresnel lenses are commonly used in virtual reality headsets due to their compactness and lightweight structure. The lenses do not use multiple pieces of material in their lenses like other lenses, but the lens will be broken down into sections, allowing the individual to have a wider range of view. The issue seen with the lens consists of seeing the ridges of the lenses when the headset is not properly aligned on the head.

The lenses introduce distortion and chromatic aberration, which are typically corrected in software. The lenses can also be adjusted dynamically to account for a user's eyeglass prescription so that the user can use the headset without corrective eyeglasses.

=== Latency requirements ===
Virtual reality headsets have significantly stricter requirements for latency—the time it takes from a change in input to have a visual effect—than ordinary video games. If the system is too sluggish to react to head movement, then it can cause the user to experience virtual reality sickness, a kind of motion sickness. According to a Valve engineer, the ideal latency would be 7–15 milliseconds.

The graphics processing unit (GPU) also needs to be powerful enough to render the required amount of frames. Oculus cited the limited processing power of Xbox One and PlayStation 4 as the reason why they targeted the PC gaming market with their first devices.

Foveated rendering is a new technique to reduce the rendering workload. It uses eye tracking hardware to determine at what point the user is looking and reduces rendering resolution farther from the user's gaze. This can be unnoticeable to the user because human peripheral vision is far less sensitive than the fovea.

== Uses in various fields ==
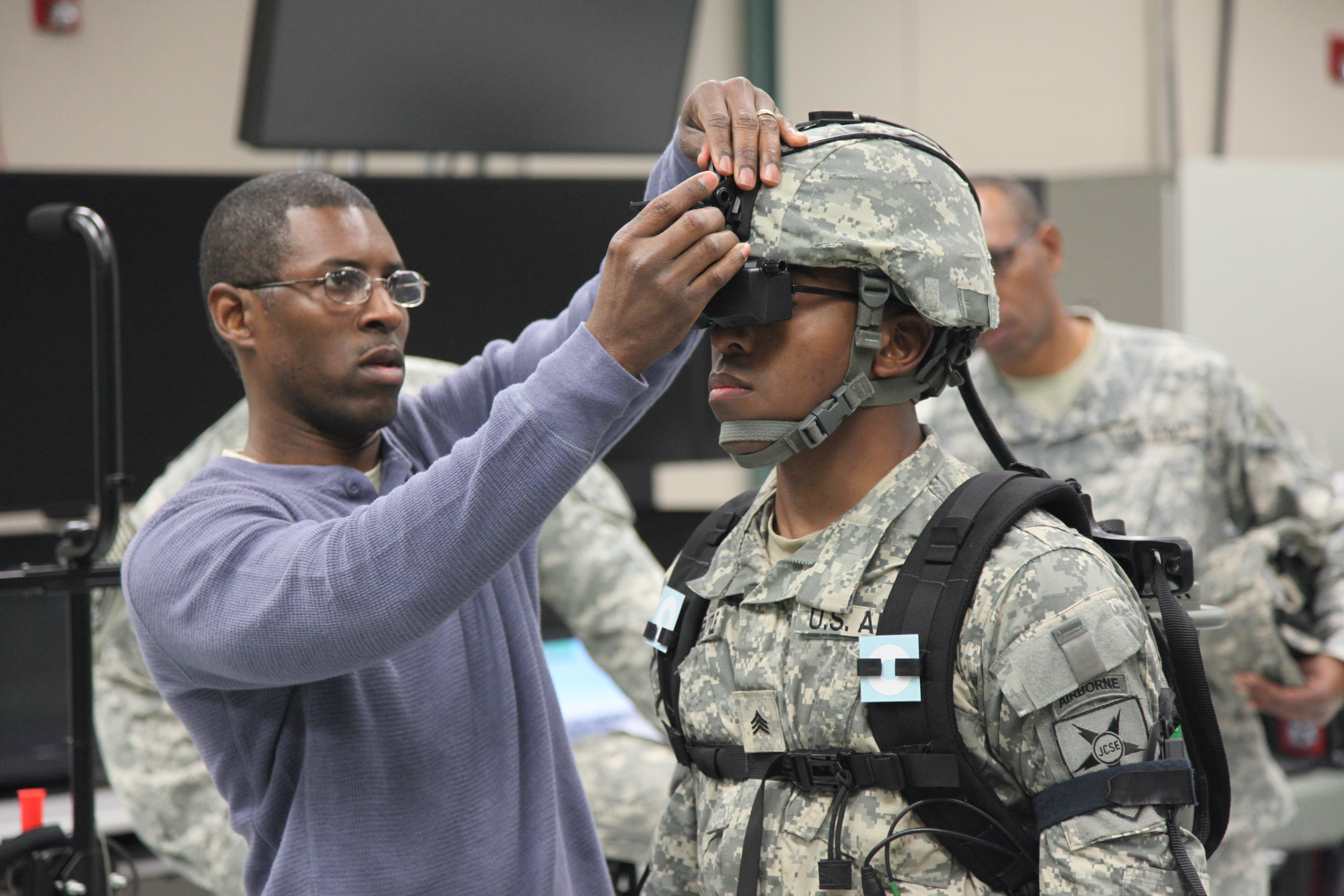
A U.S. soldier being prepared to use a ground combat training virtual reality headset at Fort Stewart in 2013

=== Medical training and diagnostics ===
Virtual reality headsets are being currently used as a means to train medical students for surgery. It allows them to perform essential procedures in a virtual, controlled environment. Students perform surgeries on virtual patients, which allows them to acquire the skills needed to perform surgeries on real patients. It also allows the students to revisit the surgeries from the perspective of the lead surgeon.

Traditionally, students had to participate in surgeries and often they would miss essential parts. Now, with the use of VR headsets, students can watch surgical procedures from the perspective of the lead surgeon without missing essential parts. Students can also pause, rewind, and fast-forward surgeries. They also can perfect their techniques in a real headset, mounted in a risk-free environment.

Besides training purposes, augmented reality headsets are also already being used for image-guided surgery.

VR headset mounted smartphones have been used to capture high-quality videos and images of the retina for documenting peripheral retinal lesions.

=== Military training ===
Virtual reality headsets have been used by the United States Armed Forces. It is a particularly useful tool for training military personnel without putting them in harm's way.

The virtual reality headset allows military personnel to interact with virtual reality people to make it feel real. They can talk to one another and do varying actions to make the virtual reality world feel like they are actually in the real world. There are also disadvantages and advantages when military personnel use the headset. The disadvantage is the headset is made for an indoor area, with a cool environment, and away from any heat, so when military personnel has just the headset on, no military equipment, it is not like their basic training. The advantages consist of repeating the situations multiple times and the cost of having the headset is less, due to no military equipment being needed.

=== Health and Safety Training ===
Virtual reality headsets are now being used to train employees in health and safety procedures. This allows trainees to experience hazardous situations in a safe, virtual environment. They can practice responding to fires, machinery failures, or chemical spills without real-world risk.

Traditionally, safety training relied on static materials or in-person drills. With VR, trainees can interact with scenarios, repeat sessions, and improve their reactions. This makes training more engaging and effective. Companies also benefit from reduced costs and improved compliance tracking.

== Theoretical advancements ==
More advanced forms of virtual reality, often referred to as full-dive virtual reality (FDVR), have been proposed in speculative fiction and theoretical discussions surrounding brain–computer interfaces (BCIs). In these hypothetical systems, users would interact with virtual environments directly through the nervous system or brain, potentially allowing simulated experiences to become indistinguishable from physical reality. Interest in FDVR increased significantly during the artificial intelligence boom of the 2020s, as advances in generative AI made it increasingly plausible for virtual worlds to be populated by dynamically generated environments, lifelike digital humans, and adaptive narratives capable of responding to users in real time. The emergence of companies such as Neuralink further intensified public discussion surrounding the long-term possibility of direct neural interaction with digital systems, although existing BCI technologies remain highly experimental and limited in capability.

Proposed applications for FDVR include education, professional training, medicine, remote socialization, digital tourism, and immersive entertainment, with some theorists additionally suggesting its use for pain management, psychological therapy, or even the preservation and emulation of human consciousness. At the same time, researchers and ethicists have warned about potential dangers associated with such technology, including psychological dependency, identity dissociation, manipulation through AI-generated realities, invasive neural data collection, and cybersecurity risks involving neural interfaces. Some futurists have also speculated that sufficiently advanced virtual realities could provide a possible explanation for the Fermi paradox, arguing that advanced civilizations may eventually choose to inhabit artificial digital environments rather than pursue large-scale physical expansion or interstellar communication.

== See also ==
- Augmented reality headset
- Curved screen
- List of virtual reality headsets
- Mixed reality
