= Target selection =

Target selection is the process by which axons (nerve fibres) selectively target other cells for synapse formation. Synapses are structures which enable electrical or chemical signals to pass between nerves. While the mechanisms governing target specificity remain incompletely understood, it has been shown in many organisms that a combination of genetic and activity-based mechanisms govern initial target selection and refinement. The process of target selection has multiple steps that include axon pathfinding when neurons extend processes to specific regions, cellular target selection when neurons choose appropriate partners in a target region from a multitude of potential partners, and subcellular target selection where axons often target particular regions of a partner neuron.

== Description ==
As bundled axons finish navigating through various neural circuits during neural development, the growth cones must selectively target with which cells it will synapse. This can be particularly well observed in the visual and olfactory systems of organisms. In order to develop into a properly functioning nervous system, there must be an extremely high degree of accuracy in which cell the growth cone forms neural connections. Although the target cell selection must be highly accurate, the degree of specificity that the neural connectivity achieves varies based on the neuronal circuitry system. The target selection process of an axon to develop synaptic connections with specific cells can be broken down into multiple stages that are not necessarily confined to exact chronological order.

The stages of targeting include:

- region specification
- target cell specification
- subcellular specification
- synaptic refinement

== Region specification ==
The first stage in target selection is specification of target region, a process known as axon pathfinding. Growing neurites follow gradients of cell surface molecules that serve as chemoattractants and repellents to the growth cone. This perspective is an evolution of the chemoaffinity hypothesis posited by the neurobiologist Roger Wolcott Sperry in the 1960s. Sperry studied how the neurons in the visual systems of amphibians and goldfish form topographic maps in the brain, noting that if the optic nerve is crushed and allowed to regenerate, the axons will trace back the same patterns of connections. Sperry hypothesized that the target cells carried "identification tags" that would guide the growing axon, which we now know as recognition molecules that bind the growth cone along a gradient.

Neurons in sensory systems like the visual, auditory, or olfactory cortex grow into topographic maps such that neighboring neurons in the periphery correspond to adjacent target locations in the central nervous system. For example, neurons nearby on the retina will project to nearby cortical cells, creating a so-called retinotopic map. This cortical organization allows organisms to more easily decode stimuli.

The mechanisms governing region specification have been well studied in numerous systems. In Drosophila, numerous axon guidance molecules have been shown to be involved in precise regionalization of the ventral nerve cord.

== Target cell specification ==
Once a growing neuron has entered the target area, they must locate and enter the appropriate target cell with which to synapse. This is accomplished through sequential signaling of attractive and repulsive cues, largely neurotrophins. The axon grows along its chemoattractant gradient until approaching the target cell, when its growth is slowed down by a sudden drop in the concentration of chemoattractant. This serves as a signal to enter the target cell.[1]

As the growth cone slows down, branches begin to form through one of two modalities: splitting of the growth cone, or interstitial branching. Growth cone splitting results in bifurcation of the main axon and is associated with axon guidance and innervating multiple faraway targets. Conversely, interstitial branching increases axonal coverage locally to define its presynaptic territory. Most mammalian CNS branches extend interstitially.[7] Branching can be caused by repulsive cues in the environment that cause the growth cone to pause and collapse, resulting in the formation of branches. [8]

To ensure successful innervation, inappropriate targeting must be prevented. Once the axon has reached its target area and started to slow down and branch, it can be held within the target area by a perimeter of cues repulsive to the growth cone.

=== Cell-to-cell interactions ===
Axons express patterns of cell-surface adhesion molecules that allow them to match with specific layer targets. An important family of adhesion molecules is constituted by the cadherins, whose different combination on targeting cells allow the traction and guidance of the forming axons. A typical example of layers with combinatorial expression of these molecules is the tectal laminae in the chick tectum, where the N-cadherin molecule is present only in those layers that receive axons form the retina.

=== Extracellular cues ===
Matrix factors and secreted cues are also very important in the formation of layered structures, and can be divided into attractive and repulsive cues, though the same factor can have both functions under varying conditions. For example, semaphorin is a substance with a repulsive effect that has been shown to have a fundamental role in layering between different somatosensory modalities in the spinal cord system.

== Synapse formation ==
The molecular mechanism of synapse formation is a process composed by different stages that relies on complex intracellular mechanisms involving both the pre- and postsynaptic cell. When the growth cone of the growing presynaptic axon makes contact with the target cell, it loses the filopodia, while both cells start expressing adhesion molecules on their respective membranes to form tight junctions, called "puncta adherens", which are similar to an adherens junction. Different classes of adhesion molecules, like SynCAM, cadherins and neuroligins/neurexins play an important role in synapse stabilization and enable synaptic formation. After the synapses have been stabilized, the pre- and postsynaptic cells undergo subcellular changes on each side of the synapses. Namely, there is an accumulation of the Golgi apparatus on the postsynaptic side, while there is an accumulation of vesicles in the presynaptic terminal. Finally at the end of synaptogenesis, there is an apposition of extracellular matrix between the cells with the formation of a synaptic cleft. Characteristic of the postsynaptic cell is the presence of a postsynaptic density (PSD), formed by PDZ-domain-containing scaffold proteins whose function is to keep the neurotransmitter receptors clustered inside the synapse.
