= Peripheral vision =

Area of one's field of vision outside of the point of fixation

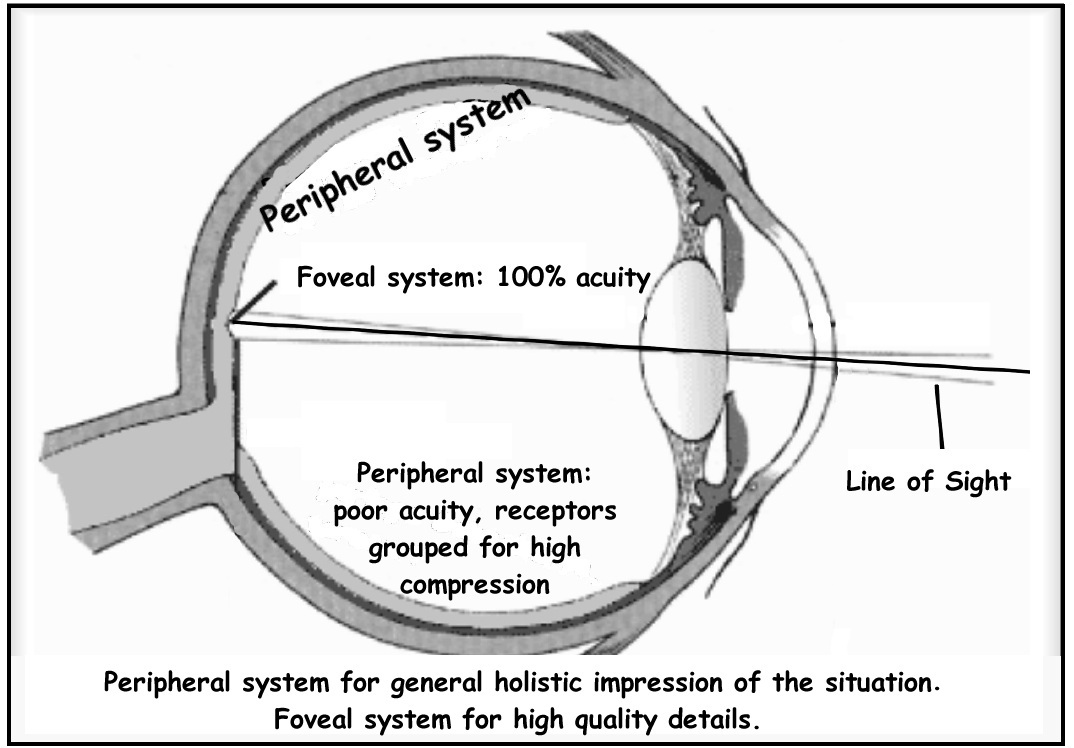

Peripheral vision of the human eye

Field of view of the human eye

Peripheral vision or indirect vision is vision as it occurs outside the point of fixation (i.e., away from the center of gaze) or, when viewed at large angles, in (or out of) the "corner of one's eye". The vast majority of the area in the visual field is included in the notion of peripheral vision. "Far peripheral" vision refers to the area at the edges of the visual field, "mid-peripheral" vision refers to medium eccentricities, and "near-peripheral", sometimes referred to as "para-central", vision, exists adjacent to the center of gaze.

== Boundaries ==
=== Inner boundaries ===
The inner boundaries of peripheral vision can be defined in any of several ways depending on the context. In everyday language the term "peripheral vision" is often used to refer to what in technical usage would be called "far peripheral vision." This is vision outside of the range of stereoscopic vision. It can be conceived as bounded at the center by a circle 60° in radius or 120° in diameter, centered around the fixation point, i.e., the point at which one's gaze is directed. However, in common usage, peripheral vision may also refer to the area outside a circle 30° in radius or 60° in diameter. In vision-related fields such as physiology, ophthalmology, optometry, or vision science in general, the inner boundaries of peripheral vision are defined more narrowly in terms of one of several anatomical regions of the central retina, in particular the fovea and the macula.

The fovea is a cone-shaped depression in the central retina measuring 1.5 mm in diameter, corresponding to 5° of the visual field. The outer boundaries of the fovea are visible under a microscope, or with microscopic imaging technology such as OCT or microscopic MRI. When viewed through the pupil, as in an eye exam (using an ophthalmoscope or retinal photography), only the central portion of the fovea may be visible. Anatomists refer to this as the clinical fovea, and say that it corresponds to the anatomical foveola, a structure with a diameter of 0.35 mm corresponding to 1 degree of the visual field. In clinical usage the central part of the fovea is typically referred to simply as the fovea.

In terms of visual acuity, "foveal vision" may be defined as vision using the part of the retina in which a visual acuity of at least 20/20 (6/6 metric or 0.0 LogMAR; internationally 1.0) is attained. This corresponds to using the foveal avascular zone (FAZ) with a diameter of 0.5 mm representing 1.5° of the visual field (although often idealized as perfect circles, the central structures of the retina tend to be irregular ovals). Thus, foveal vision may also be defined as the central 1.5–2° of the visual field. Vision within the fovea is generally called central vision, while vision outside of the fovea, or even outside the foveola, is called peripheral, or indirect vision.

A ring-shaped region surrounding the fovea, known as the parafovea, is sometimes taken to represent an intermediate form of vision called paracentral vision. The parafovea has an outer diameter of 2.5 mm representing 8° of the visual field.

The macula, the next larger region of the retina, is defined as having at least two layers of ganglia (bundles of nerves and neurons) and is sometimes taken as defining the boundaries of central vs. peripheral vision (but this is controversial). Estimates of the macula's size differ, its diameter estimated at 6° – 10° (corresponding to 1.7 – 2.9 mm), up to 17° of the visual field (5.5 mm). The term is familiar in the general public through the widespread macular degeneration (AMD) at older age, where central vision is lost. When viewed from the pupil, as in an eye exam, only the central portion of the macula may be visible. Known to anatomists as the clinical macula (and in clinical setting as simply the macula) this inner region is thought to correspond to the anatomical fovea.

A dividing line between near and mid peripheral vision at 30° radius can be based on several features of visual performance. Visual acuity declines systematically up to 30° eccentricity: At 2°, acuity is half the foveal value, at 4° one-third, at 6° one-fourth etc. At 30°, it is one-sixteenth the foveal value. From thereon the decline is steeper. (Note that it would be wrong to say, the value were halved every 2°, as said in some textbooks or in previous versions of this article.) Color perception is strong at 20° but weak at 40°. In dark-adapted vision, light sensitivity corresponds to rod density, which peaks just at 18°. From 18° towards the center, rod density declines rapidly. From 18° away from the center, rod density declines more gradually, in a curve with distinct inflection points resulting in two humps. The outer edge of the second hump is at about 30°, and corresponds to the outer edge of good night vision.

=== Outer boundaries ===
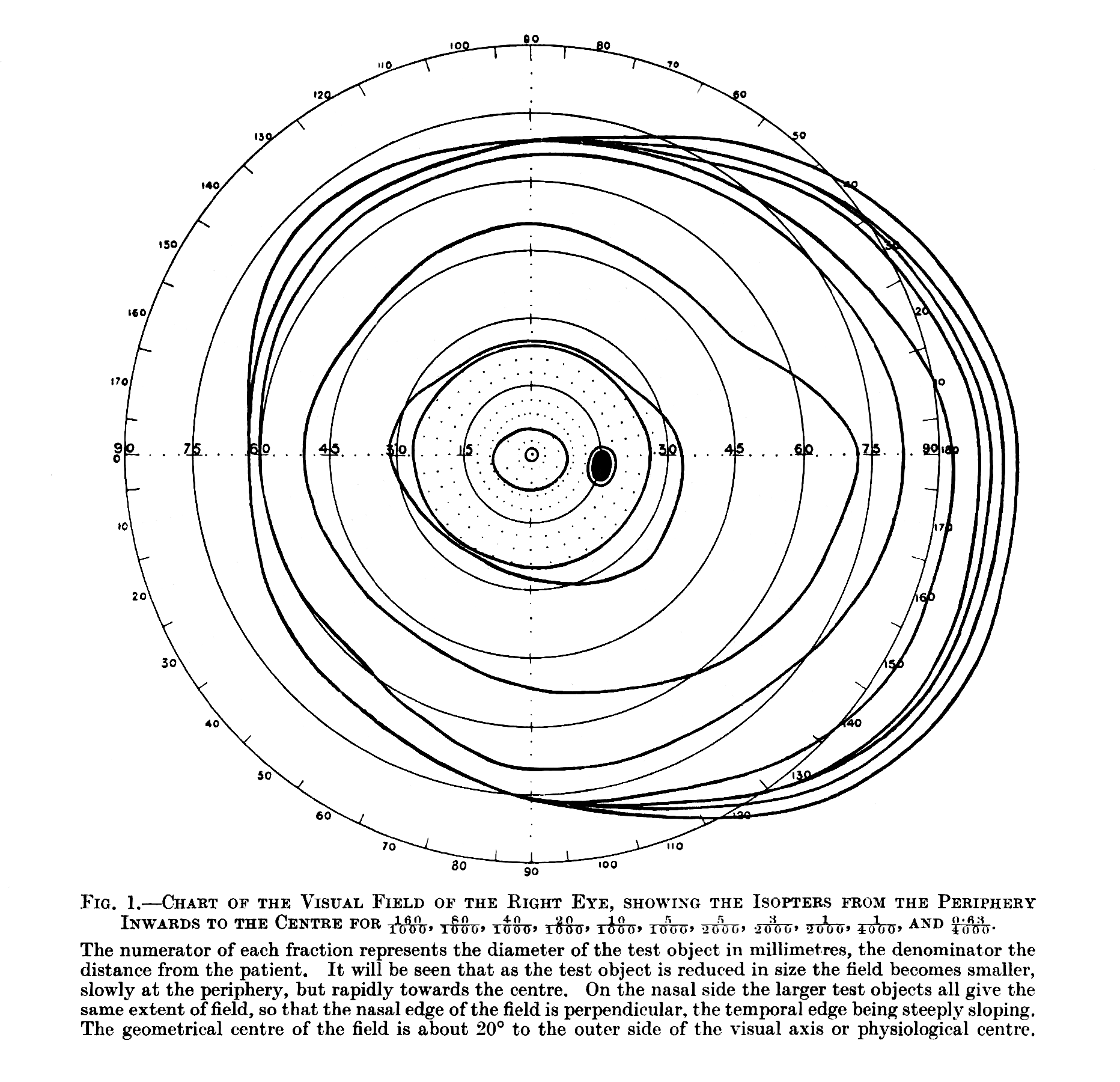
Classical image of the shape and size of the visual field

The outer boundaries of peripheral vision correspond to the boundaries of the visual field as a whole. For a single eye, the extent of the visual field can be (roughly) defined in terms of four angles, each measured from the fixation point, i.e., the point at which one's gaze is directed. These angles, representing four cardinal directions, are 60° upwards, 60° nasally (towards the nose), 70–75° downwards, and 100–110° temporally (away from the nose and towards the temple). For both eyes the combined visual field is 130–135° vertically and 200–220° horizontally.

== Characteristics ==
The loss of peripheral vision while retaining central vision is known as tunnel vision, and the loss of central vision while retaining peripheral vision is known as central scotoma.

Peripheral vision is weak in humans, especially at distinguishing detail, color, and shape. This is because the density of receptor and ganglion cells in the retina is greater at the center and lowest at the edges, and, moreover, the representation in the visual cortex is much smaller than that of the fovea (see visual system for an explanation of these concepts). The distribution of receptor cells across the retina is different between the two main types, rod cells and cone cells. Rod cells are unable to distinguish color and peak in density in the near periphery (at 18° eccentricity), while cone cell density is highest in the very center, the fovea. Note that this does not mean that there is a lack of cones representing in the periphery; colors can be distinguished in peripheral vision.

Flicker fusion thresholds decline towards the periphery, but do that at a lower rate than other visual functions; so the periphery has a relative advantage at noticing flicker. Peripheral vision is also relatively good at detecting motion (a feature of Magno cells).

Central vision is relatively weak in the dark (scotopic vision) since cone cells lack sensitivity at low light levels. Rod cells, which are concentrated further away from the fovea, operate better than cone cells in low light. This makes peripheral vision useful for detecting faint light sources at night (like faint stars). Because of this, pilots are taught to use peripheral vision to scan for aircraft at night.

Ovals A, B and C show which portions of the chess situation chess masters can reproduce correctly with their peripheral vision. Lines show path of foveal fixation during 5 seconds when the task is to memorize the situation as correctly as possible. Image from based on data by

The distinctions between foveal (sometimes also called central) and peripheral vision are reflected in subtle physiological and anatomical differences in the visual cortex. Different visual areas contribute to the processing of visual information coming from different parts of the visual field, and a complex of visual areas located along the banks of the interhemispheric fissure (a deep groove that separates the two brain hemispheres) has been linked to peripheral vision. It has been suggested that these areas are important for fast reactions to visual stimuli in the periphery, and monitoring body position relative to gravity.

== Functions ==
The main functions of peripheral vision are:

- recognition of well-known structures and forms with no need to focus by the foveal line of sight
- identification of similar forms and movements (Gestalt psychology laws)
- delivery of sensations which form the background of detailed visual perception

== Extreme peripheral vision ==
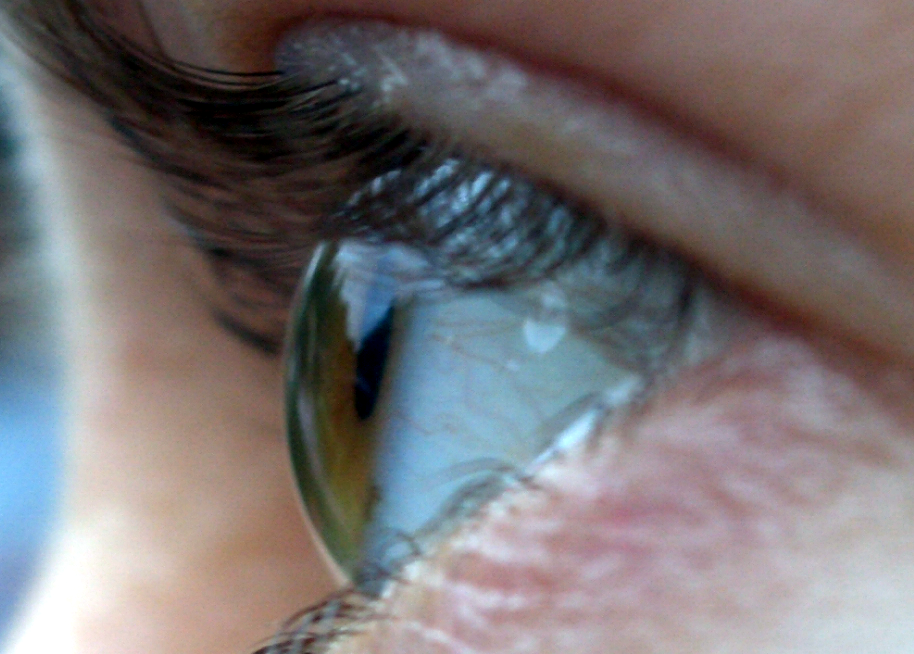
Side-view of the human eye, viewed approximately 90° temporal, illustrating how the iris and pupil appear rotated towards the viewer due to the optical properties of the cornea and the aqueous humor.

When viewed at large angles, the iris and pupil appear to be rotated toward the viewer due to the optical refraction in the cornea. As a result, the pupil may still be visible at angles greater than 90°.

=== Cone-rich rim of the retina ===
The rim of the retina contains a large concentration of cone cells. The retina extends farthest in the superior-nasal 45° quadrant (in the direction from the pupil to the bridge of the nose) with the greatest extent of the visual field in the opposite direction, the inferior temporal 45° quadrant (from the pupil of either eye towards the bottom of the nearest ear). Vision at this extreme part of the visual field is thought to be possibly concerned with threat detection, measuring optical flow, color constancy, or circadian rhythm.

== See also ==
- Averted vision
- Bitemporal hemianopsia
- Depth perception
- Eye movement
- Eye movement in music reading
- Fovea
- Perimetry
- Visual field
- Visual perception
- Tunnel vision
- Binocular vision
- Macular degeneration
- Glaucoma
