= Retinotopy =

Mapping of visual input from the retina to neurons

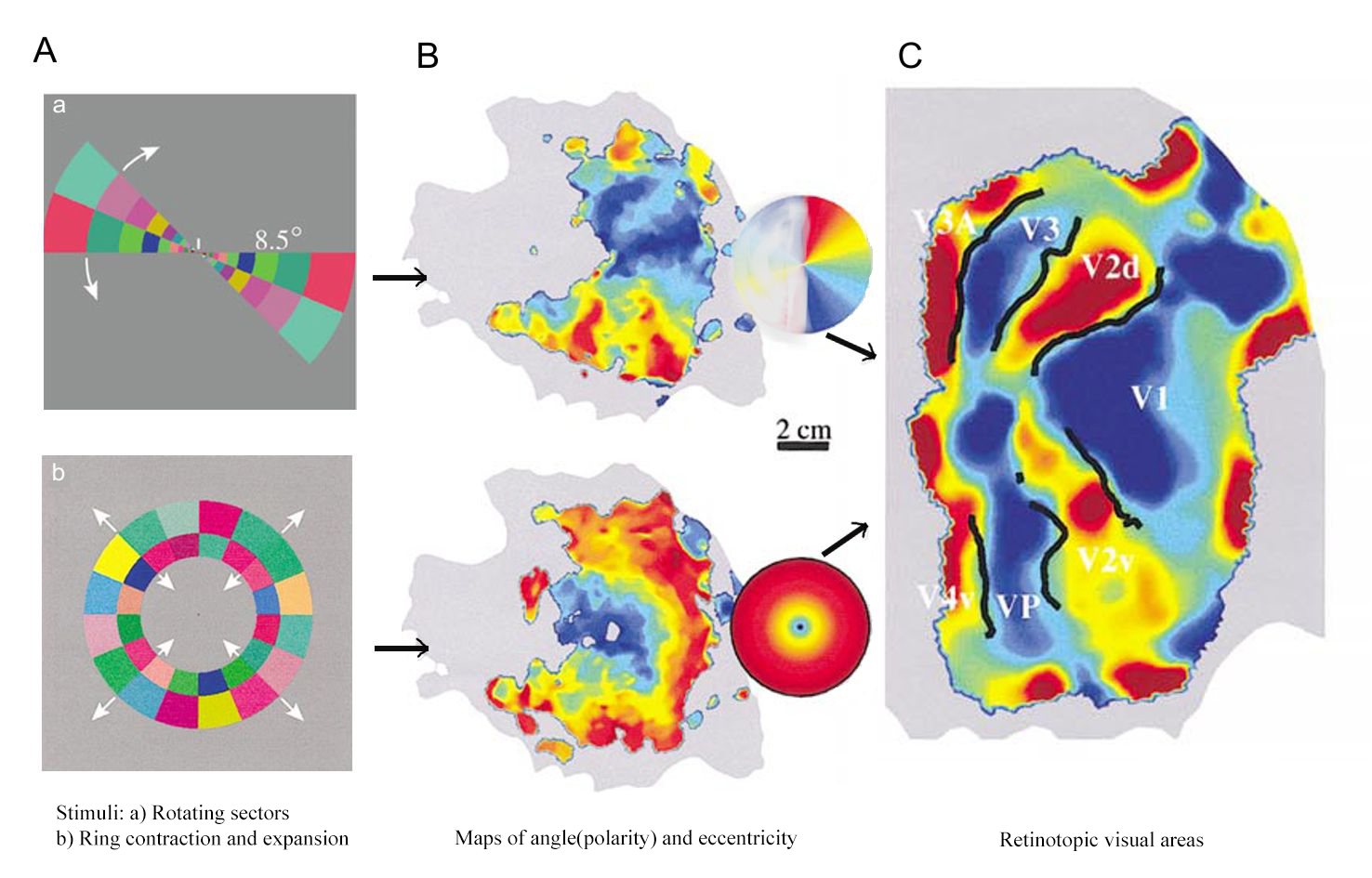
Retinotopic maps with explanation

Retinotopy (from Greek τόπος (tópos) 'place') is the mapping of visual input from the retina to neurons, particularly those neurons within the visual stream. For clarity, 'retinotopy' can be replaced with 'retinal mapping', and 'retinotopic' with 'retinally mapped'.

Visual field maps (retinotopic maps) are found in many amphibian and mammalian species, though the specific size, number, and spatial arrangement of these maps can differ considerably. Sensory topographies can be found throughout the brain and are critical to the understanding of one's external environment. Moreover, the study of sensory topographies and retinotopy in particular has furthered our understanding of how neurons encode and organize sensory signals.

Retinal mapping of the visual field is maintained through various points of the visual pathway including but not limited to the retina, the dorsal lateral geniculate nucleus, the optic tectum, the primary visual cortex (V1), and higher visual areas (V2-V4).

Retinotopic maps in cortical areas other than V1 are typically more complex, in the sense that adjacent points of the visual field are not always represented in adjacent regions of the same area. For example, in the second visual area (V2), the map is divided along an imaginary horizontal line across the visual field, in such a way that the parts of the retina that respond to the upper half of the visual field are represented in cortical tissue that is separated from those parts that respond to the lower half of the visual field. Even more complex maps exist in the third and fourth visual areas V3 and V4, and in the dorsomedial area (V6). In general, these complex maps are referred to as second-order representations of the visual field, as opposed to first-order (continuous) representations such as V1.

Additional retinotopic regions include ventral occipital (VO-1, VO-2), lateral occipital (LO-1, LO-2), dorsal occipital (V3A, V3B), and posterior parietal cortex (IPS0, IPS1, IPS2, IPS3, IPS4).

== History ==
In the late 19th-century, independent animal studies including some on dogs by the physiologist Hermann Munk and some on monkeys by the neurologist David Ferrier elucidated that lesions to the occipital and parietal lobes induced blindness. Around the turn of the century, Swedish neurologist and pathologist Salomon Henschen had a prolific body of work on the mind that included much research on neuropathology. Although only partially accurate, he correlated the location of brain lesion to areas of occluded vision. He became an early proponent of the existence of a visual map which he called the "cortical retina".

Early accurate mapping of the visual map arose from studying cranial injuries in war. Maps were described and analyzed by the Japanese ophthalmologist Tatsuji Inouye when studying soldiers' injuries incurred in the Russo-Japanese War, although his work on the subject—published in 1909 through a German monograph—was largely ignored and abandoned to obscurity. Independently of Inouye a few years later, the British neurologist Gordon Holmes made similar advances studying the injuries suffered by soldiers in World War I. Both scientists observed correlations between the position of an entry wound and the presented visual field loss in the patient. (See Fishman, 1997 for an in-depth historical review.)

== Development ==
=== Molecular cues ===
The "chemoaffinity hypothesis" was established by Sperry et al in 1963 in which it is thought that molecular gradients in both presynaptic and postsynaptic partners within the optic tectum organize developing axons into a coarse retinotopic map. This was established after a series of seminal experiments in fish and amphibians showed that retinal ganglion axons were already retinotopically organized within the optic tract and if severed, would regenerate and project back to retinotopically appropriate locations. Later, it was identified that receptor tyrosine kinases family EphA and a related EphA binding molecule referred to as ephrin-A family are expressed in complementary gradients in both the retina and the tectum. More specifically in the mouse, Ephrin A5 is expressed along the rostral-caudal axis of the optic tectum whereas the EphB family is expressed along the medio-lateral axis. This bimodal expression suggests a mechanism for the graded mapping of the temporal-nasal axis and the dorsoventral axis of the retina.

=== Target space ===
While molecular cues are thought to guide axons into a coarse retinotopic map, the resolution of this map is thought to be influenced by available target space on postsynaptic partners. In wild type mice, it is thought that competition of target space is important for ensuring continuous retinal mapping, and that if perturbed, this competition may lead to the expansion or compression of the map depending on the available space. If the available space is altered, such as lesioning or ablating half of the retina, the healthy axons will expand their arbors in the tectum to fill the space. Similarly, if part of the tectum is ablated, the retinal axons will compress the topography to fit within the available tectal space.

=== Neural activity ===
While neural activity in the retina is not necessary for the development of retinotopy, it seems to be a critical component for the refinement and stabilization of connectivity. Dark reared animals (no external visual cues) develop a normal retinal map in the tectum with no marked changes in receptive field size or laminar organization. While these animals may not have received external visual cues during development, these experiments suggest that spontaneous activity in the retina may be sufficient for retinotopic organization. In the goldfish, no neural activity (no external visual cues, and no spontaneous activity) did not prevent the formation of the retinal map but the final organization showed signs of lower resolution refinement and more dynamic growth (less stable). Based on Hebbian mechanisms, the thought is that if neurons are sensitive to similar stimuli (similar area of the visual field, similar orientation or direction selectivity) they will likely fire together. This patterned firing will result in stronger connectivity within the retinotopic organization through NMDAR synapse stabilization mechanisms in the post synaptic cells.

=== Dynamic growth ===
Another important factor in the development of retinotopy is the potential for structural plasticity even after neurons are morphologically mature. One interesting hypothesis is that axons and dendrites are continuously extending and retracting their axons and dendrites. Several factors alter this dynamic growth including the chemoaffinity hypothesis, the presence of developed synapses, and neural activity. As the nervous system develops and more cells are added, this structural plasticity allows for axons to gradually refine their place within the retinotopy. This plasticity is not specific to retinal ganglion axons, rather it's been shown that dendritic arbors of tectal neurons and filopodial processes of radial glial cells are also highly dynamic.

== Description ==
In many locations within the brain, adjacent neurons have receptive fields that include slightly different, but overlapping portions of the visual field. The position of the center of these receptive fields forms an orderly sampling mosaic that covers a portion of the visual field. Because of this orderly arrangement, which emerges from the spatial specificity of connections between neurons in different parts of the visual system, cells in each structure can be seen as contributing to a map of the visual field (also called a retinotopic map, or a visuotopic map). Retinotopic maps are a particular case of topographic organization. Many brain structures that are responsive to visual input, including much of the visual cortex and visual nuclei of the brain stem (such as the superior colliculus) and thalamus (such as the lateral geniculate nucleus and the pulvinar), are organized into retinotopic maps, also called visual field maps.

Areas of the visual cortex are sometimes defined by their retinotopic boundaries, using a criterion that states that each area should contain a complete map of the visual field. However, in practice the application of this criterion is in many cases difficult. Those visual areas of the brainstem and cortex that perform the first steps of processing the retinal image tend to be organized according to very precise retinotopic maps. The role of retinotopy in other areas, where neurons have large receptive fields, is still being investigated.

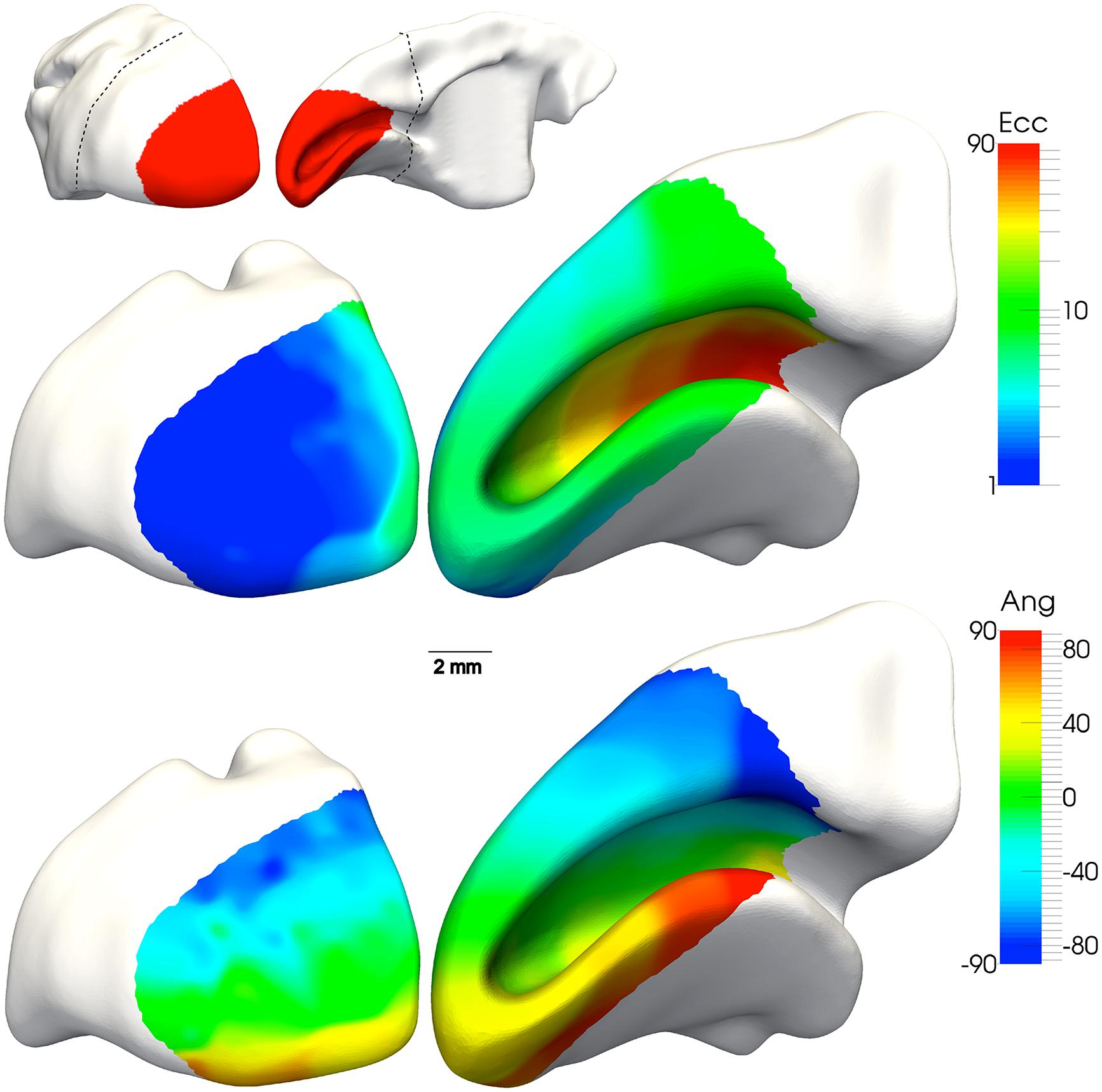
Location and visuotopic organization of marmoset primary visual cortex (V1)

Retinotopy mapping shapes the folding of the cerebral cortex. In both the V1 and V2 areas of macaques and humans the vertical meridian of their visual field tends to be represented on the cerebral cortex's convex gyri folds whereas the horizontal meridian tends to be represented in their concave sulci folds.

== Methods ==
Retinotopy mapping in humans is done with functional magnetic resonance imaging (fMRI). fMRI retinotopic mapping provides an image with detailed information about the relationship between the visual field and its cortical representation. There are five steps that are used to obtain a retinotopic image, beginning with obtaining the cortical surface model. This is done by making a high-resolution and high contrast-to-noise structural MR image of the brain. This clearly displays the different brain tissues such as gray and white matter, as well as cerebrospinal fluid. The second step is to then extract a model of the cortical surface from the segmeented volme to represent the center of the cortical gray matter where the functional activation is expected. Then, the subject inside the fMRI machine focuses on a point. Then the retina is stimulated with a circular image or angled lines about the focus point. The stimuli for retinotopic mapping are designed to encode the position in the visual field through a unique pattern of temporal activation. The stimuli are moved periodically with concentric expanding or contracting rings and clockwise or counterclockwise rotating wedges that are shown while the patient is fixating their vision on the center or apex. The radial map displays the distance from the center of vision. The angular map shows angular location using rays angled about the center of vision. By combining the radial and angular maps, the separate regions of the visual cortex and the smaller maps in each region can be seen.

== See also ==
- Biological neural network
- Cortical magnification
- Frontal eye field
- Tonotopy
- Visual space
