= Eccentricity =

Eccentricity or eccentric may refer to:

- Eccentricity (behavior), odd behavior on the part of a person, as opposed to being "normal"

== Mathematics, science and technology ==
=== Mathematics ===
- Off-center, in geometry
- Eccentricity (graph theory) of a vertex in a graph
- Eccentricity (mathematics), a parameter associated with every conic section

=== Orbital mechanics ===
- Orbital eccentricity, in astrodynamics, a measure of the non-circularity of an orbit
- Eccentric anomaly, the angle between the direction of periapsis and the current position of an object on its orbit
- Eccentricity vector, in celestial mechanics, a dimensionless vector with direction pointing from apoapsis to periapsis
- Eccentric, a type of deferent, a circle or sphere used in obsolete epicyclical systems to carry a planet around the Earth or Sun

=== Other uses in science and technology ===
- Eccentric (mechanism), a wheel that rotates on an axle that is displaced from the focus of the circle described by the wheel
- Horizontal eccentricity, in vision, degrees of visual angle from the center of the eye
- Eccentric contraction, the lengthening of muscle fibers
- Eccentric position of a surveying tripod, to be able to measure hidden points
- Eccentric training, the motion of an active muscle while it is lengthening under load
- Eccentricity, a deviation from concentricity

== Other uses ==
- Eccentric Club, a London gentlemen's club
- The Eccentric
- The Eccentrics

== See also ==
- Acentric (disambiguation)
