= Meridian crossing effect =

The meridian-crossing effect is a phenomenon described and evidenced for in the scientific field of visual neuropsychology. It refers to an increase in reaction time to non-attended stimuli located across the vertical meridian, compared to non-attended stimuli located across the horizontal meridian (Huges & Zimba, 1987), i.e., the movement of attention is slower when it has to cross the vertical meridian as compared to the horizontal meridian. The horizontal meridian in a visual field extends from the left to the right of the observer. The vertical meridian, on the other hand extends from above the line of sight of the observer to below the line of sight of the observer. The vertical meridian can also be seen as a barrier that differentiates the attended stimuli from the non- attended stimuli. Meridian crossing effect can also be called different-hemifield advantage. According to this, performance rates increase when a task is completed across both the left and right visual hemifields than when performed in a within hemifield version of the task (Sereno & Kosslyn, 1991). A hemifield can be defined as a 170° range of vision that is seen by one eye focusing straight ahead. This should not be confused with bilateral distribution advantage. Different-hemifield advantage mainly holds true only for early perceptual processes. It focuses on the competition for attentional resources in spatial attention. Bilateral distribution advantage on the other hand occurs during more complex or demanding tasks. The Meridian crossing effect was first described by H. C. Huges and L. D. Zimba in the year 1987 in their paper, "Natural boundaries for the spatial spread of directed visual attention".

== History ==
The original study by Huges and Zimba started off as an extension of the various studies done revolving around the concept of directed attention, its spatial characteristics and the movement of attention to different locations within the visual field. Their first experiment aimed to determine whether visual performance varied for locations across the vertical and horizontal meridian based on expectancy and to check if attention can be directed both vertically and horizontally. The results showed that cues directed to locations on both the vertical meridian and the horizontal meridian, have similar attentional costs and benefits. Nevertheless, they also reported that subjects have larger decrements in performance when their attention crosses the vertical meridian than when it crosses the horizontal meridian (Huges and Zimba, 1987).

== Theoretical context ==
Meridian crossing effect came about as an extension of one of the theories of the spatial structure of attention (Sereno & Kosslyn, 1991).

=== Shifting focus theories ===
This is one of the oldest theories of the spatial structure of attention. According to this theory, subjects require more time to process targets that occur at unexpected locations as compared to those that occur at expected locations.

=== Gradient theories ===
According to this theory, resources are processed and made available based on the expectancy of target location, i.e., the farther a stimulus is from the locus of attention, the less processing resources are available (Sereno & Kosslyn, 1991).

=== Hemifield theories ===
Similar to gradient theories, hemifield theories also predict a gradient of attention. However this gradient is spread out throughout the visual hemifield in which the target is expected. This therefore, is a benefit to that hemifield and a disadvantage to the opposite hemifield (Sereno & Kosslyn).

== Neurobiological bases ==
One of the proposed reasons for the decrease in performance when attention crosses the vertical meridian is the shifting of processing of the information from one cerebral hemisphere to the other, across the corpus callosum (Huges & Zimba, 1987). According to Downing and Pinker (1985), on the other hand, decrements in attention when it crosses the vertical meridian can be attributed to the crossing of the foveal region, i.e., the attentional gradient becomes steeper at the fovea. Therefore, two points which are equally distant from each other seem farther apart at the foveal region as compared to when within the same boundary (Downing and Pinker, 1985).

== Cognitive bases ==
On the basis of the experiments conducted by Sereno and Kosslyn (1991), in which participants were confronted with two briefly presented stimuli either in one visual hemifield or in the left and right visual hemifields, they argued that the different-hemifield advantage may result from separate, hemisphere-specific pools of attentional capacity operating during perceptual encoding, leading to twice as many resource pools being available during task performance across both hemifields. Processing multiple stimuli that are presented within one hemifield is suggested to lead to high intrahemispheric competition for common processing structures and low interhemispheric competition for representation and requires hemisphere specific processes to take place in parallel (Sereno & Kosslyn, 1991). But the extent to which these pools of processing information impact attention has not been accounted for. Further research needs to be done to understand the causes of this different hemifield advantage.
