= Cortical magnification =

Relation between visual stimuli and neuron activation in the visual cortex

In neuroscience, cortical magnification describes how many neurons in an area of the visual cortex are 'responsible' for processing a stimulus of a given size, as a function of visual field location. (Note: Patches of primary visual cortical areas can be associated with visual field locations because the visual cortex is retinotopically organized.) In the center of the visual field, corresponding to the center of the fovea of the retina, a very large number of neurons process information from a small region of the visual field. If the same stimulus is seen in the periphery of the visual field (i.e. away from the center), it would be processed by a much smaller number of neurons. The reduction of the number of neurons per visual field area from foveal to peripheral representations is achieved in several steps along the visual pathway, starting already in the retina.

For quantitative purposes, the cortical magnification factor is normally expressed in millimeters of cortical surface per degree of visual angle. When expressed in this way, the values of cortical magnification factor vary by a factor of approximately 30 – 90 between the foveal and peripheral representation of the primary visual cortex (V1), depending on how the estimate is obtained. The inverse of M (i.e. degrees visual angle per millimeter cortical tissue) increases linearly with eccentricity in the visual field.

Visual performance depends importantly on the amount of cortical tissue devoted to the task. As an example, spatial resolution (i.e. visual acuity) is best in the center of the fovea and lowest in the far periphery. Consequently, visual performance variations across the visual field can often be equalized by enlarging stimuli depending on their location in the visual field by a factor that compensates for cortical magnification, which is referred to as M scaling (M=magnification). However, the variation of visual performance across the visual field differs widely between different functions (pattern recognition, motion perception, etc.), and cortical magnification is only one factor amongst others that determine visual performance.

== See also ==
- Retinotopy
