= Umbo =

Umbo may refer to:

== Anatomy ==
- Umbo (eye), tiny depression in the center of the foveola corresponding to the foveal reflex
- Umbo of tympanic membrane, the central, most inverted portion of the eardrum

== Flora and fauna ==
- Umbo (bivalve), part of a bivalve shell which was formed when the animal was a juvenile
- Umbo (conifer cone), the first year's growth of a seed scale on a conifer cone, showing up as a protuberance at the end of the two-year-old scale
- Umbo (mycology), at the top of some mushrooms

== Other ==
- Otto Umbehr (1902–1980), a German photographer known as "Umbo"
- A shield boss, a round, convex, or conical piece of material at the center of a shield
