= Acentric =

Acentric may refer to:

- Acentric factor, in thermodynamics, the measure of the non-sphericity (acentricity) of molecules
- Acentric chromosome, in genetics, a chromosome without centromere
- Acentric fragment, in genetics, a chromosome segment lacking a centromere

== See also ==
- Eccentricity (disambiguation)
