= Perifovea =

Region in the retina

Photograph of the retina of the human eye, with overlay diagrams showing the positions and sizes of the macula, fovea, and optic disc

Perifovea is a region in the retina that circumscribes the parafovea and fovea and is a part of the macula lutea. The perifovea is a belt that covers a 10° radius around the fovea and is 1.5 mm wide. The perifovea ends when the Henle's fiber layer disappears and the ganglion cells are one-layered.

== Additional images ==
Schematic diagram of the macula lutea of the retina, showing perifovea, parafovea, fovea, and clinical macula

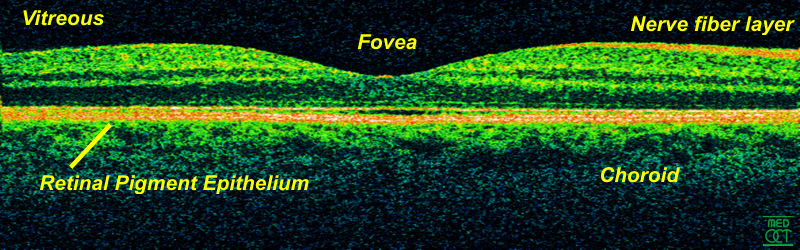
Time-Domain OCT of the macular area of a retina at 800 nm, axial resolution 3 μm

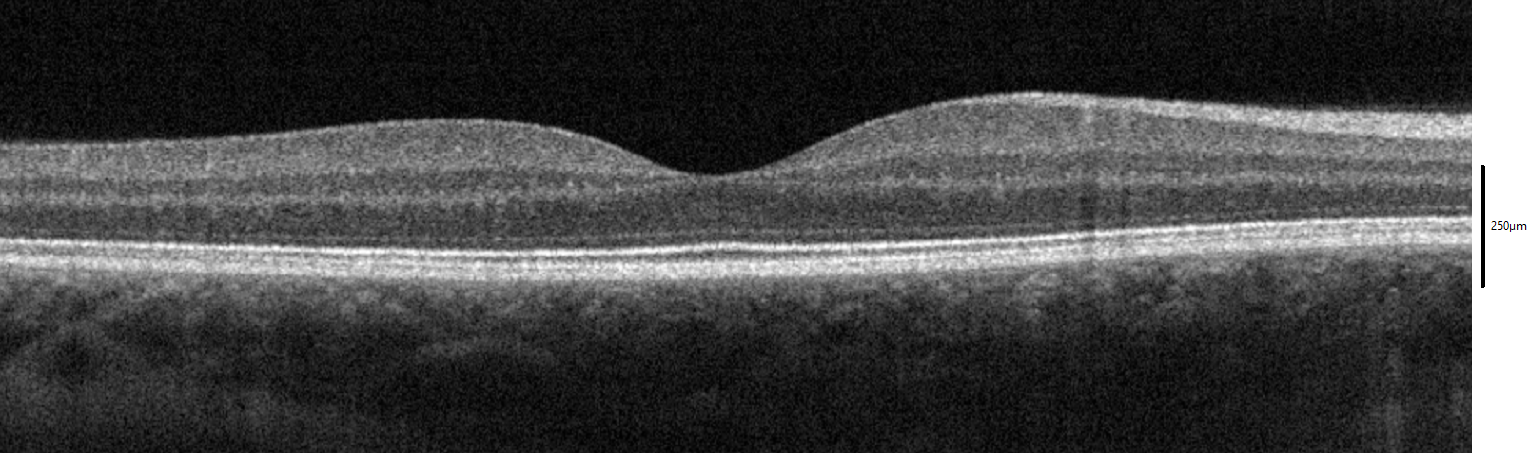
Spectral-Domain OCT macula cross-section scan.

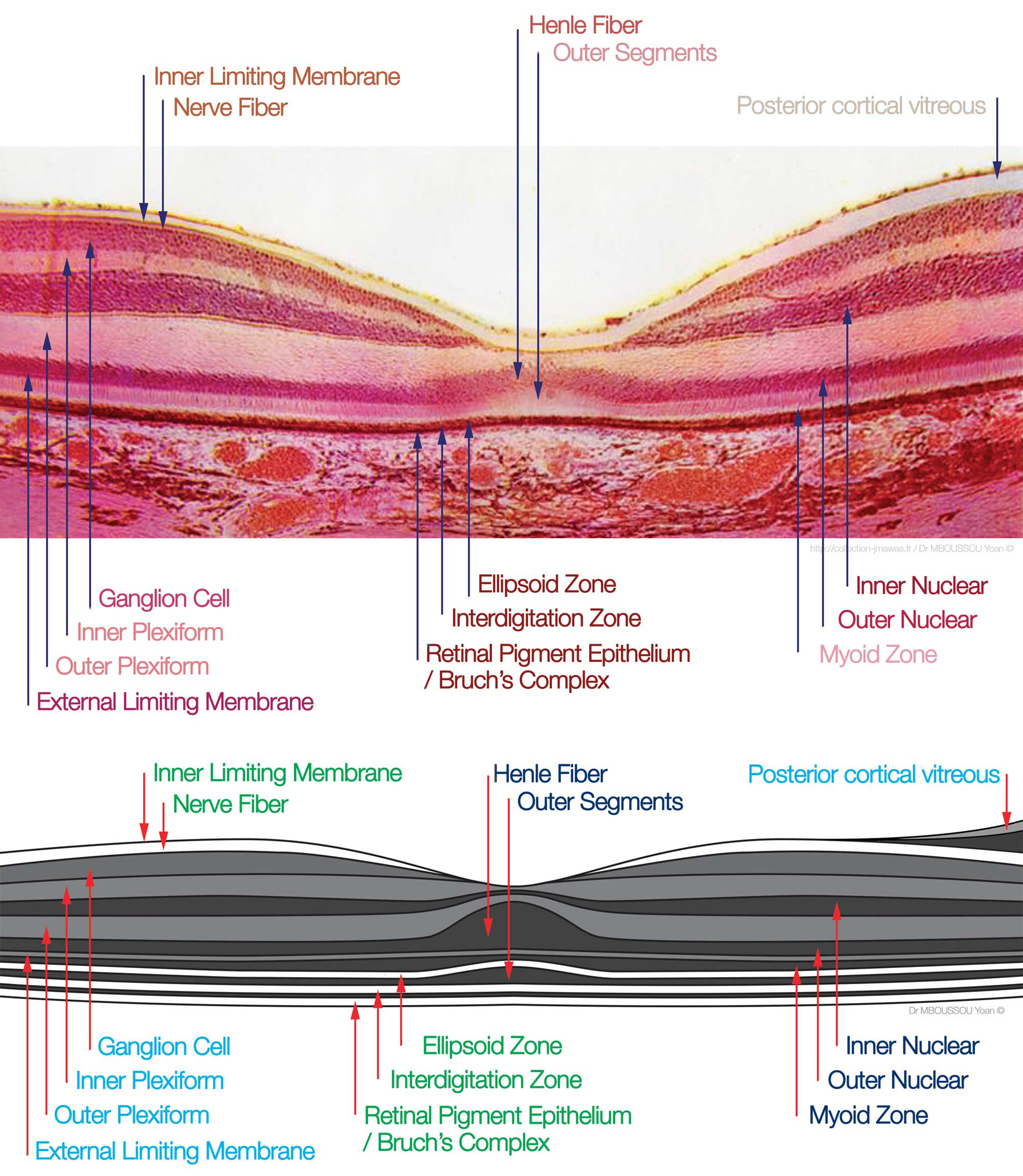
macula histology (OCT)

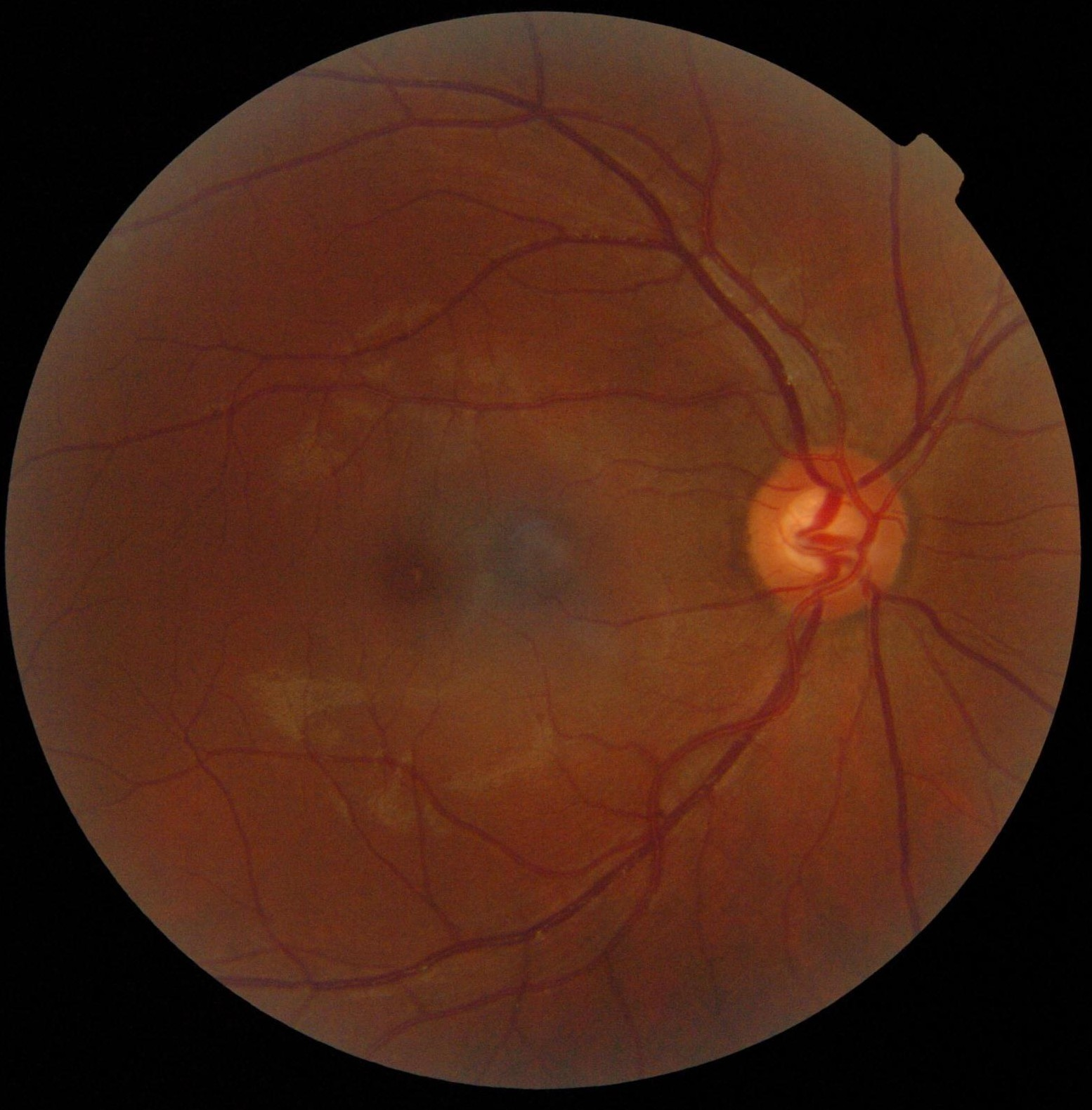
A fundus photograph showing the macula as a spot to the left. The optic disc is the area on the right where blood vessels converge. The grey, more diffuse spot in the centre is a shadow artifact.

== See also ==
- Eye movements in reading
- Fixation (visual)
- Optical coherence tomography (OCT)
