= Topographic map (neuroanatomy) =

Mapping senses to the central nervous system

In neuroanatomy, a topographic map is the ordered projection of a sensory surface (like the retina or the skin) or an effector system (like the musculature) to one or more structures of the central nervous system. Topographic maps can be found in all sensory systems and in many motor systems.

== Visual system ==
The visual system refers to the part of the central nervous system that allows an organism to see. It interprets information from visible light to build a representation of the world. The ganglion cells of the retina project in an orderly fashion to the lateral geniculate nucleus (LGN) of the thalamus and from there to the primary visual cortex (V1); adjacent spots on the retina are represented by adjacent neurons in the lateral geniculate nucleus and the primary visual cortex. The term for this pattern of projection is topography. There are many types of topographic maps in the visual cortices, including retinotopic maps, ocular dominance maps and orientation maps. Retinotopic maps are the easiest to understand in terms of topography. Retinotopic maps are those in which the image on the retina is maintained in the cortices (V1 and the LGN). In other words, if a specific region of the cortices was damaged, that individual would then have a blind spot in the real world, they would not be able to see the bit of the world that corresponded to the retina damage. Orientation maps are also topographic. In these maps there are cells which have a preference to a certain orientation, the maximum firing rate of the cell will be achieved at that preference. As the orientation is moved away from, the firing rate will drop. An orientation map is topographic because neighboring neural tissues have similar orientation preferences.

The term retinotopic refers to the maintenance of the particular order of afferent connections from the retina along the afferent pathway via sub-cortical structures to V1 and other cortical visual areas. The primary visual cortex (V1, Brodmann's area 17) is the first cortical area to receive visual input. The stria of Gennari – a set of heavily myelinated, horizontally projecting axons within the termination zone of lateral geniculate nucleus (LGN) input to V1 – provides an anatomical marker particular to V1.

=== Development ===
According to the chemoaffinity hypothesis, chemical labels are distributed in a graded fashion across the retina and tectum. This allows each retinal ganglion cell to recognize its proper termination site. Experiments with artificially created compound eyes in Xenopus demonstrate that not only the ganglion cells but also their axons carry these specificities. Axons must be able to communicate with each other to ensure that ones with the same positional tags innervate the same area of the superior colliculus.

=== Categories of retinotopic maps ===
First-order representations are those in which adjacent points of the same hemifield always map to adjacent columns in the contralateral cortex. An example of this would be the map in primary visual cortex (V1).

Second-order representations, also known as a field discontinuity map, are maps that are organized such that it appears that a discontinuity has been introduced in either the visual field or the retina. The maps in V2 and other extrastriate cortex are second-order representations.

== Auditory system ==
The auditory system is the sensory system for hearing in which the brain interprets information from the frequency of sound waves, yielding the perception of tones. Sound waves enter the ear through the auditory canal. These waves arrive at the eardrum where the properties of the waves are transduced into vibrations. The vibrations travel through the bones of the inner ear to the cochlea. In the cochlea, the vibrations are transduced into electrical information through the firing of hair cells in the organ of Corti. The organ of Corti projects in an orderly fashion to structures in the brainstem (namely, the cochlear nuclei and the inferior colliculus), and from there to the medial geniculate nucleus of the thalamus and the primary auditory cortex. Adjacent sites on the organ of Corti, which are themselves selective for the sound frequency, are represented by adjacent neurons in the aforementioned CNS structures. This projection pattern has been termed tonotopy.

The tonotopic layout of sound information begins in the cochlea where the basilar membrane vibrates at different positions along its length depending upon the frequency of the sound. Higher frequency sounds are at the base of the cochlea, if it were unrolled, and low frequency sounds are at the apex. This arrangement is also found in the auditory cortex in the temporal lobe. In areas that are tonotopically organized, the frequency varies systematically from low to high along the surface of the cortex, but is relatively constant across cortical depth. The general image of topographic organization in animals is multiple tonotopic maps distributed over the surface of the cortex.

== Somatosensory system ==
The somatosensory system comprises a diverse range of receptors and processing centers to produce the perception of touch, temperature, proprioception, and nociception. Receptors are located throughout the body including the skin, epithelia, internal organs, skeletal muscles, bones, and joints. The cutaneous receptors of the skin project in an orderly fashion to the spinal cord, and from there, via different afferent pathways (dorsal column-medial lemniscus tract and spinothalamic tract), to the ventral posterior nucleus of the thalamus and the primary somatosensory cortex. Again, adjacent areas on the skin are represented by adjacent neurons in all aforementioned structures. This projection pattern has been termed somatotopy.

One common diagram of the somatotopic map is the cortical homunculus. This illustration is a fairly accurate representation of how much cortical area represents each body part or region. It also maps what part of the cortex represents each region of the body.

== Motor system ==
Unlike the topographic maps of the senses, the neurons of the motor cortex are efferent neurons that exit the brain instead of bringing information to the brain through afferent connections. The motor system is responsible for initiating voluntary or planned movements (reflexes are mediated at the spinal cord level, so movements associated with a reflex are not initiated by the motor cortex). The activation from the motor cortex travels through Betz cells down the corticospinal tract through upper motor neurons, terminating at the anterior horn of the grey matter where lower motor neurons transmit the signal to peripheral motor neurons and, finally, the voluntary muscles.

=== Movements not requiring use of topographic maps ===
There are several instances of movements that do not require the participation of topographic maps, or even the participation of the brain. One instance would be (as already stated) in some reflexes. Reflexes usually are mediated at the level of the spinal cord through reflex arcs. In humans, mono-, oligo-, and poly-synaptic reflex arcs, propriospinal interneuron systems, and internuncial gray matter neurons collectively participate continuously to produce spinal cord reflex that activates muscle.

The higher motor centers of octopuses (large brained invertebrates) are notable for organizing (unlike vertebrates) highly skilled movements without the use of somatotopic maps of their bodies.

== Olfactory system ==
The olfactory system is the sensory system used for olfaction, or the sense of smell. It detects volatile, airborne substances.

Most sensory systems spatially segregate afferent input from primary sensory neurons to construct a topographic map that defines the location of a sensory stimulus within the environment, as well as the quality of the stimulus itself. Unlike other sensory systems, the topography in the olfactory system is not dependent on spatial properties of the stimuli. Relieved of the requirement to map the position of an olfactory stimulus in space, the olfactory system employs spatial segregation of sensory input to encode the quality of an odorant.

The topographic map revealed in the olfactory system differs in quality from the orderly representation inherent in the retinotopic, tonotopic, or somatotopic sensory maps. Olfactory neurons differ from one another by the nature of the receptor that they possess. However, the olfactory sensory neurons to which olfactory bulb neurons are connected are also distributed across the receptor sheet (the olfactory epithelium) depending on their chemical preferences. Locations on the olfactory epithelium and the olfactory bulb are correlated so, as with other sensory systems, the topographic map in the brain is linked to the structure of the peripheral organ. This principle is called rhinotopy.

Individual olfactory sensory neurons express only one of the thousand receptor genes, such that neurons are functionally distinct. Cells expressing a given receptor in the olfactory epithelium are randomly dispersed within 1 of 4 broad zones. Sensory neurons extend a single unbranched axon to the olfactory bulb such that the projections from neurons expressing a specific receptor converge on 2 out of the 1800 glomeruli. The pattern of convergence is absolute and invariant in all individuals in a species. The bulb therefore provides a spatial map that identifies which of the numerous receptors have been activated within the sensory epithelium so that the quality of an olfactory stimulus is encoded by specific combination of glomeruli activated by a given odorant (combinatorial code).

While refinement of the bulbar topographic code relies on activity, the development occurs partly without apparent contribution from activity-dependent processes. Mice lacking the olfactory cyclic nucleotide-gated ion channel fail to exhibit odor-evoked electrophysiological responses in the sensory epithelium, but the pattern of convergence of like axons in the bulb is unaltered in these mutant mice, arguing strongly that olfactory experience is not necessary for the establishment or refinement of the topographic map.

These findings, however, do not exclude a role for activity-dependent processes in the maintenance or potential plasticity of the map after it is established. For example, neurons that do not express functional odorant receptors have been observed to have a significantly shorter half-life. Activity-dependent processes may therefore be essential for the survival of the olfactory neurons postnatally, and in that manner, may alter the input to individual glomeruli, altering the sensitivity to individual odors.

== Gustatory system ==
The gustatory system is the sensory system for taste. Like olfaction, taste requires a process of chemoreception. The receptors for taste are taste buds on the tongue. The tongue contains taste receptors, as well as mechanoreceptors. Afferents from taste receptors and mechanoreceptors of the tongue access different ascending systems in the brainstem. However, it is uncertain how these two sources of information are processed in cortex. The primary gustatory cortex (G) is located near the somatotopic region for the tongue (S1), in the insular cortex deep in the lateral fissure with the secondary taste areas in the opercula.

The peripheral taste system likely maintains a specific relationship between taste bud cells selectively responsive to one taste quality and the ganglion cells signaling that particular quality. This explains the response specificity of some individual taste nerve, particularly because sweet, amino acid, and bitter receptors are expressed in distinct populations of taste cells. Although anatomical evidence for such an exclusive relationship is lacking at the level of single receptor and ganglion cells, the relationship between single buds and their innervating ganglion cells is tractable neuroanatomically. In taste, attempts to identify a spatial representation of taste receptors or taste qualities have revealed only an indistinct functional topography in the brain. Nevertheless, taste ganglion cells must distribute peripheral fibers to particular receptor cell types and disseminate impulses centrally in a structurally organized manner.

== Benefits ==
For neurons, it is metabolically costly to make long connections, and the trade-off of connection distance is time. Thus, it is good design to group neurons together that are to be highly interconnected. Multiple topographic maps is a feature that is advantageous because it allows maps of different sizes that would accommodate varying levels of acuity and details in signals. A more detailed map has more neurons that would take up more area than a more global map, which would require fewer connections.

== Techniques ==
A variety of techniques have been used to establish the topographic maps in the brain. The existence of topographical maps was shown early by electrical stimulation of the cortex, tracing patterns of epileptic seizures, stimulation sequences, and impairments due to lesions. Details in the maps came later through microelectrode stimulation and recording techniques became commonly used in demonstrating somatotopic maps and later in the auditory and visual systems, both cortically and in subcortical structures such as the colliculi and geniculate nuclei of the thalamus. Single-cell recording, transcranial magnetic stimulation (TMS), electrical stimulation of the cortex, and functional magnetic resonance imaging (fMRI) are some of the techniques used to study maps in the brain. Many of the existing topographic maps have been further studied or refined using fMRI. For example, Hubel and Wiesel originally studied the retinotopic maps in the primary visual cortex using single-cell recording. Recently, however, imaging of the retinotopic map in the cortex and in sub-cortical areas, such as the lateral geniculate nucleus, have been improved using the fMRI technique.

== See also ==
- Sensory map
