= Averted vision =

Technique for viewing faint objects with peripheral vision

Averted vision is a technique for viewing faint objects which uses peripheral vision. It involves not looking directly at the object, but looking a little off to the side, while continuing to concentrate on the object. This subject is discussed in the popular astronomy literature but only a few rigorous studies have quantified the effect.

There is some evidence that the technique has been known since ancient times, as it seems to have been reported by Aristotle while observing the star cluster now known as M41. This technique of being able to see very dim lights over a long distance has also been passed down over hundreds of generations of sailors whose duties included standing lookout watches, making one better able to spot dim lights from other ships or shore locations at night. The technique has also been used in military training.

The same technique can be employed with or without a telescope (looking to the side with the naked eye or looking towards the edge of the telescope's field of view). An additional technique called scope rocking may also be used, which is done by simply moving the telescope back and forth slightly to move the object around in the field of view. This technique is based on the fact that the visual system is more sensitive to motion than to static objects.

== Physiology ==
Averted vision works because there are virtually no rods (cells which detect dim light in black and white) in the fovea: a small area in the center of the eye. The fovea contains primarily cone cells, which serve as bright light and color detectors and are not as useful during the night. This situation results in a decrease in visual sensitivity in central vision at night. Based on the early work of Osterberg (1935), and later confirmed by modern adaptive optics, the density of the rod cells usually reaches a maximum around 20 degrees off the center of vision. Some researchers have contested the claim that averted vision is due solely to rod cell density, because the peak sensitivity to stars is not at 20 degrees.

== See also ==
- Peripheral vision – Area of one's field of vision outside of the point of fixation
- Scotopic vision – Visual perception under low-light conditions
- Purkinje effect – Tendency for sight to shift toward blue colors at low light levels
