= Foveal avascular zone =

Region of the retina of the eye

The foveal avascular zone (FAZ) is a region within the fovea centralis at the centre of the retina of the human eye that is devoid of retinal blood vessels. The geometric centre of the FAZ is often taken to be the centre of the macula and thus the point of fixation.

The FAZ is an important anatomical landmark in fluorescein angiography. Its diameter is 0.5mm, the central 1.5 degrees of an individual's visual field.
