= Macula =

Oval-shaped pigmented area near the center of the retina

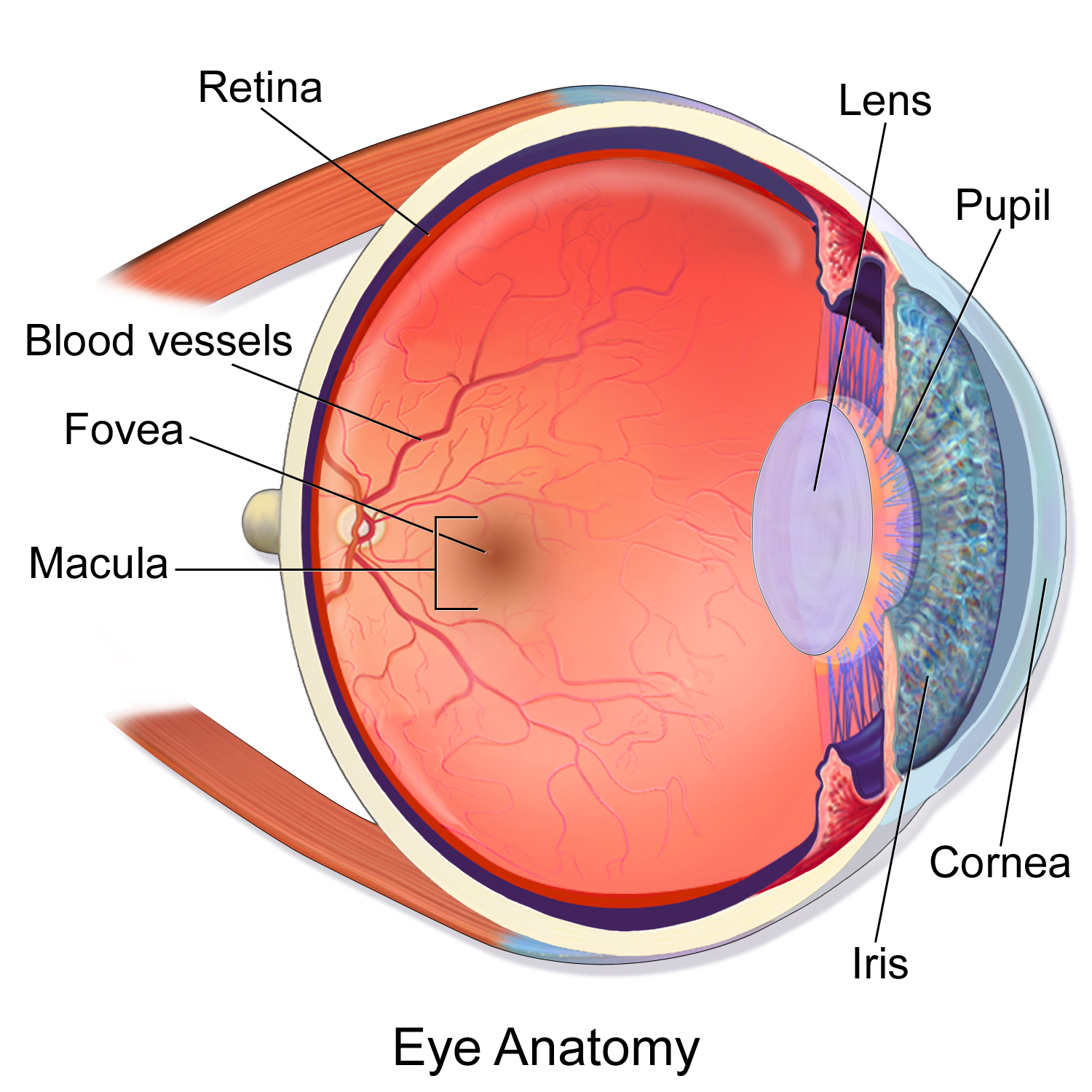
- The macula is the central part of the retina of the human eye, its center slightly shifted to the temporal side. (The location in the image is misleading: it looks as if the macula were far removed from the center which is not the case.)

Details
- Part of: Retina of human eye
- System: Visual system

Identifiers
- Latin: macula lutea
- MeSH: D008266
- TA98: A15.2.04.021
- TA2: 6784
- FMA: 58637

The macula (/ˈmækjʊlə/), in full macula lutea, is an oval-shaped pigmented area in the center of the retina of the human eye and in other animals. The macula in humans has a diameter of around 5.5 mm (0.22 in) and is subdivided into the umbo, foveola, foveal avascular zone, fovea, parafovea, and perifovea areas.

The anatomical macula, at a size of 5.5 mm (0.22 in), is much larger than the clinical macula, which, at a size of 1.5 mm (0.059 in), corresponds to the anatomical fovea.

The macula is responsible for the central, high-resolution, color vision that is possible in good light. This kind of vision is impaired if the macula is damaged, as in macular degeneration. The clinical macula is seen when viewed from the pupil, as in ophthalmoscopy or retinal photography.

The term macula lutea comes from Latin macula, "spot", and lutea, "yellow".

== Structure ==
Photograph of the retina of the human eye, with overlay diagrams showing the positions and sizes of the macula, fovea, and optic disc

Schematic diagram of the macula lutea of the retina, showing perifovea, parafovea, fovea, and clinical macula

The macula is an oval-shaped pigmented area in the center of the retina of the human eye and other animal eyes. Its center is shifted slightly away from the optical axis (laterally, by 5°=1.5 mm). The macula in humans has a diameter of around 5.5 mm (0.22 in) and is subdivided into the umbo, foveola, foveal avascular zone, fovea, parafovea, and perifovea areas. An even smaller central region of highest receptor density (40–80 μm) is sometimes referred to as the foveal bouquet. The anatomical macula at 5.5 mm (0.22 in) is much larger than the clinical macula which, at 1.5 mm (0.059 in), corresponds to the anatomical fovea.

The clinical macula is seen when viewed from the pupil, as in ophthalmoscopy or retinal photography. The anatomical macula is defined histologically in terms of having two or more layers of ganglion cells. The umbo is the center of the foveola which in turn is located at the center of the fovea.

The fovea is located near the center of the macula. It is a small pit that contains the largest concentration of cone cells. The retina's receptor layer contains two types of photosensitive cells, the rod cells and the cone cells.

=== Color ===
Because the macula is yellow in color, it absorbs excess blue and ultraviolet light that enter the eye and acts as a natural sunblock (analogous to sunglasses) for this area of the retina. The yellow color comes from its content of lutein and zeaxanthin, which are yellow xanthophyll carotenoids, derived from the diet. Zeaxanthin predominates at the macula, while lutein predominates elsewhere in the retina. There is some evidence that these carotenoids protect the pigmented region from some types of macular degeneration. A formulation of 10 mg lutein and 2 mg zeaxanthin has been shown to reduce the risk of age-related macular degeneration progressing to advanced stages, although these carotenoids have not been shown to prevent the disease.

After death or enucleation (removal of the eye), the macula appears yellow, a color that is not visible in the living eye except when viewed with light from which red has been filtered.

=== Regions ===
- Fovea – 1.55 mm (0.061 in)
- Foveal avascular zone (FAZ) – 0.5 to 0.6 mm (0.020 to 0.024 in)
- Foveola – 0.35 mm (0.014 in)
- Umbo – 0.15 mm (0.0059 in)

== Function ==
Structures in the macula are specialized for high-acuity vision. Within the macula are the fovea and foveola that both contain a high density of cones, which are nerve cells that are photoreceptors with high acuity.

In detail, the normal human eye contains three different types of cones, with different ranges of spectral sensitivity. The brain combines the signals from neighboring cones to distinguish different colors. There is only one type of rod, but the rods are more sensitive than the cones, so in dim light, they are the dominant photoreceptors active, and without information provided by the separate spectral sensitivity of the cones it is impossible to discriminate colors. In the fovea centralis, cones predominate and are present at high density. The macula is thus responsible for the central, high-resolution, color vision that is possible in good light; and this kind of vision is impaired if the macula is damaged, for example in macular degeneration.

== Clinical significance ==
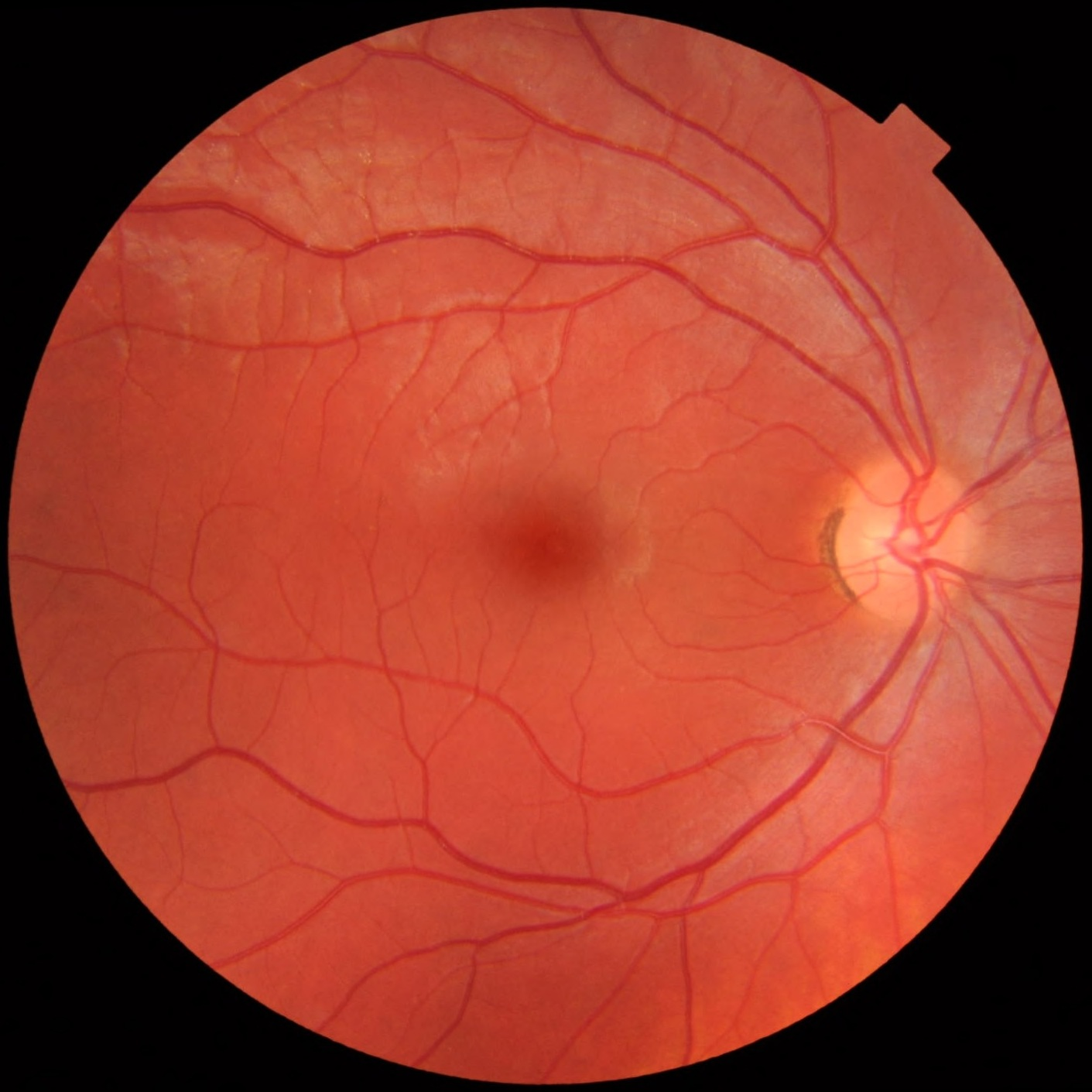
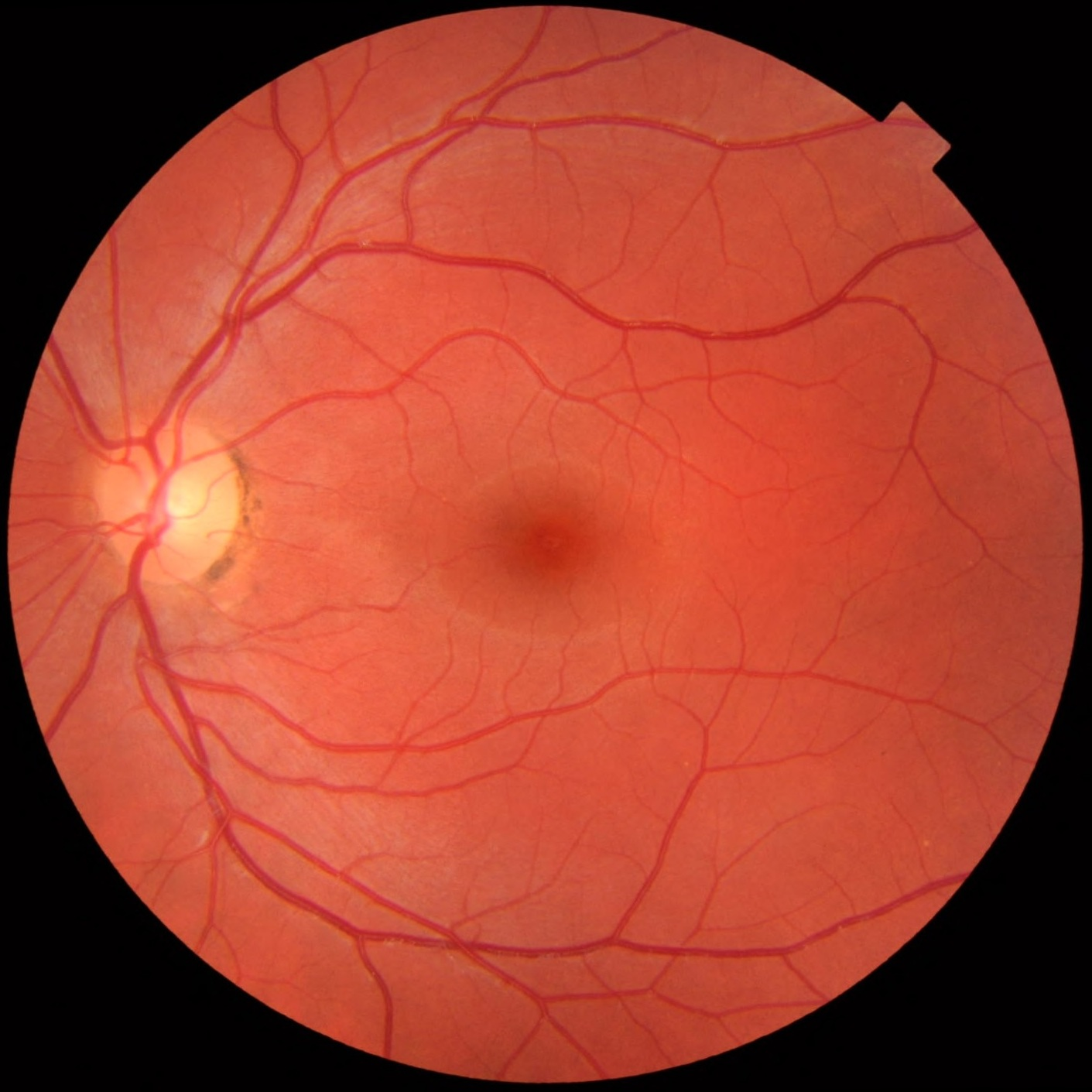
Fundus photographs of the right eye (left image) and left eye (right image), seen from front so that left in each image is to the person's right. The gaze is into the camera, so in each picture the macula is in the center of the image, and the optic disc is located towards the nose.

The clinical macula is seen when viewed from the pupil, as in ophthalmoscopy or retinal photography.

Whereas loss of peripheral vision may go unnoticed for some time, damage to the macula will result in loss of central vision, which is usually immediately obvious. The progressive destruction of the macula is a disease known as macular degeneration and can sometimes lead to the creation of a macular hole. Macular holes are rarely caused by trauma, but if a severe blow is delivered it can burst the blood vessels going to the macula, destroying it.

Visual input from the macula occupies a substantial portion of the brain's visual capacity. As a result, some forms of visual field loss that occur without involving the macula are termed macular sparing. (For example, visual field testing might demonstrate homonymous hemianopsia with macular sparing.)

In the case of occipitoparietal ischemia owing to occlusion of elements of either posterior cerebral artery, patients may display cortical blindness (which, rarely, can involve blindness that the patient denies having, as seen in Anton's Syndrome), yet display sparing of the macula. This selective sparing is due to the collateral circulation offered to macular tracts by the middle cerebral artery. Neurological examination that confirms macular sparing can go far in representing the type of damage mediated by an infarct, in this case, indicating that the caudal visual cortex (which is the principal recipient of macular projections of the optic nerve) has been spared. Further, it indicates that cortical damage rostral to, and including, lateral geniculate nucleus is an unlikely outcome of the infarction, as too much of the lateral geniculate nucleus is, proportionally, devoted to macular-stream processing.

== Additional images ==
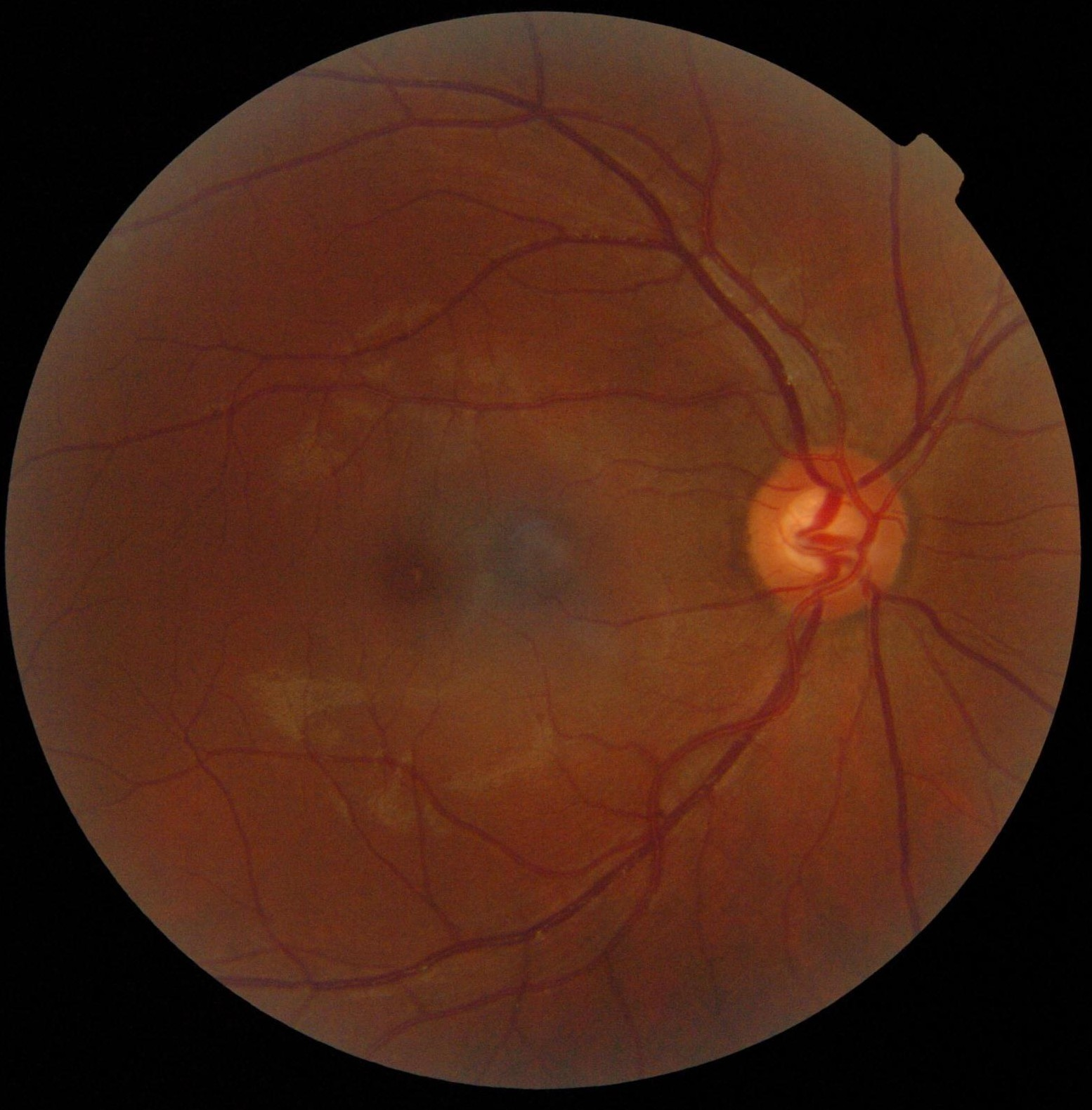
A fundus photograph showing the macula as a spot to the left. The optic disc is the area on the right where blood vessels converge. The grey, more diffuse spot in the centre is a shadow artifact.

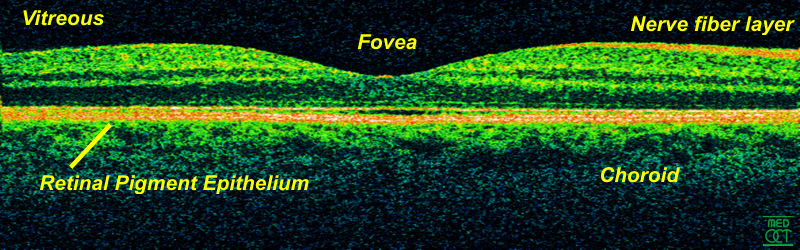
Time-Domain OCT of the macular area of a retina at 800 nm, axial resolution 3 μm

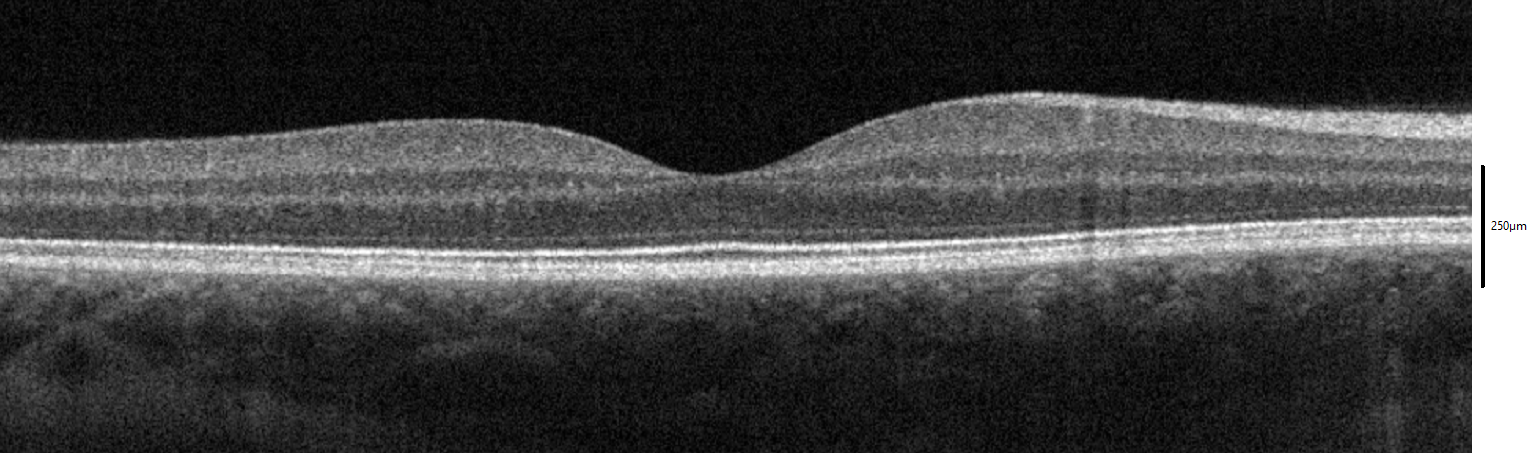
Spectral-Domain OCT macula cross-section scan.

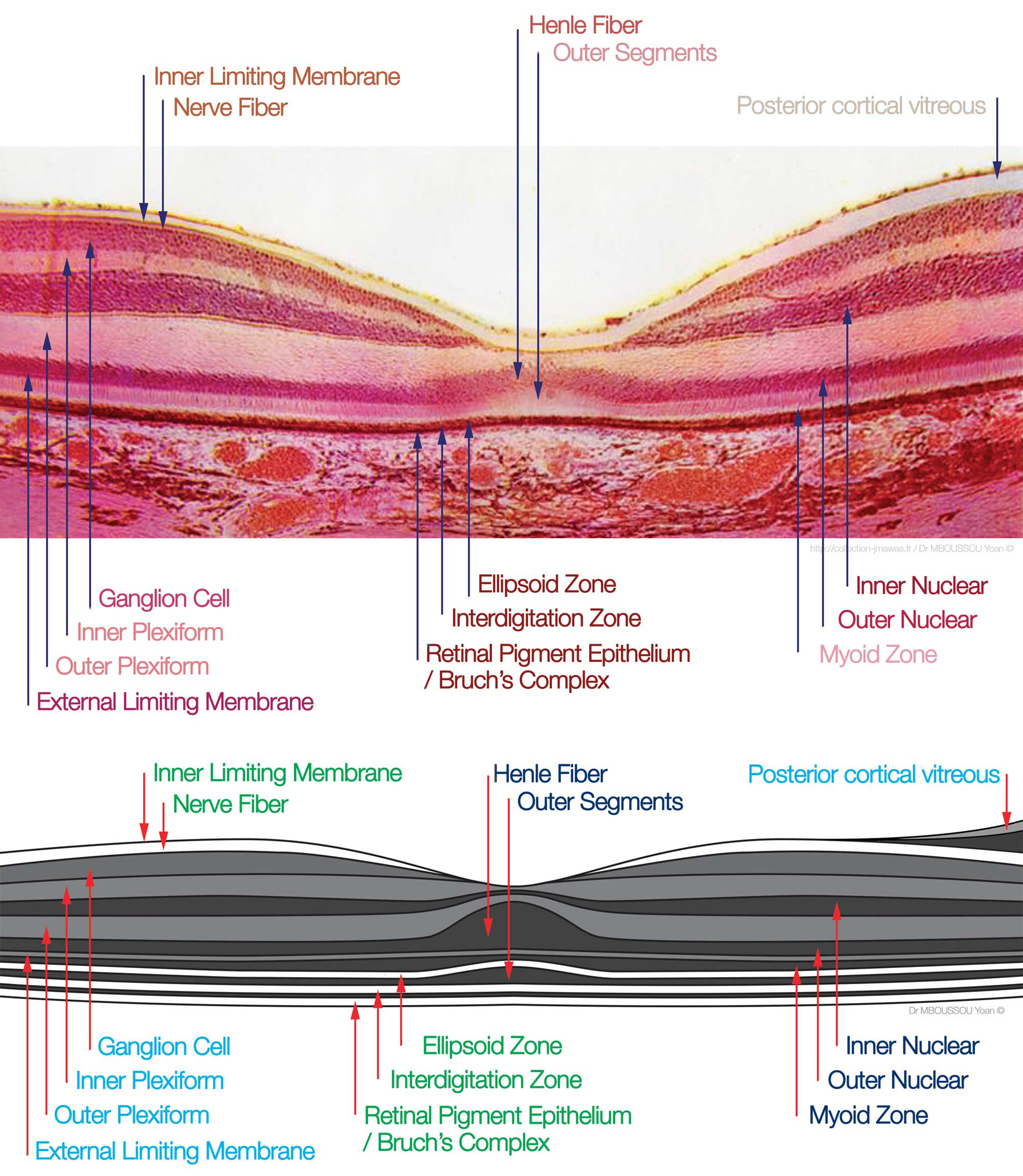
macula histology (OCT)

== See also ==
- Macular degeneration
- Macular edema
- Macular pucker (epiretinal membrane)
- Cherry-red spot
- Macular hypoplasia
- Photic retinopathy
- Intermediate uveitis
