= Parafovea =

Region in the retina of the eye

Parafovea or the parafoveal belt is a region in the retina that circumscribes the fovea and is part of the macula lutea. It is circumscribed by the perifovea.

Photograph of the retina of the human eye, with overlay diagrams showing the positions and sizes of the macula, fovea, and optic disc

== Effect on reading ==
In reading, information within 1° (approximately 6–8 characters) of the point of fixation is processed in foveal vision, while information up to 6° of visual angle benefits from parafoveal preview. Studies have shown that people can tell the difference in the letters of a word in the fovea and near-parafovea (the part of the parafovea closest to the fovea), but not in the outer edges of the parafovea. In languages that read from left to right, the word immediately to the right of the fixated word is known as the parafoveal word. Information present in the parafovea can interact with information present in the fovea. The benefit the parafoveal preview has is also mediated by how common the word in the parafovea is, with less common words providing less of a reduction in fixation duration when they reach foveal fixation. As the clarity of information in the parafovea is not as great as in the fovea, the SWIFT model of eye movements in reading, while allowing for parallel processing, accounts for this difference by assigning the parafoveal less processing power the further away it is from the foveal fixation.

== Effect on scene perception ==
Information in the parafovea can influence the processing of a scene. In categorization tasks of natural scenes information from the parafovea can be used to determine the gist of a scene well enough for a categorization judgement, though with reduced sensitivity and speed in comparison to foveal vision. An effect of parafoveal preview has also been found for emotional scenes presented in the parafovea, with people more likely shift their fixation point on emotional stimuli than neutral stimuli, when both options are presented parafoveally.

== Additional images ==
Schematic diagram of the macula lutea of the retina, showing perifovea, parafovea, fovea, and clinical macula

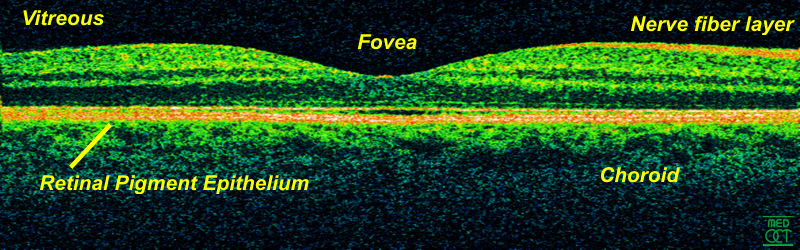
Time-Domain OCT of the macular area of a retina at 800 nm, axial resolution 3 μm

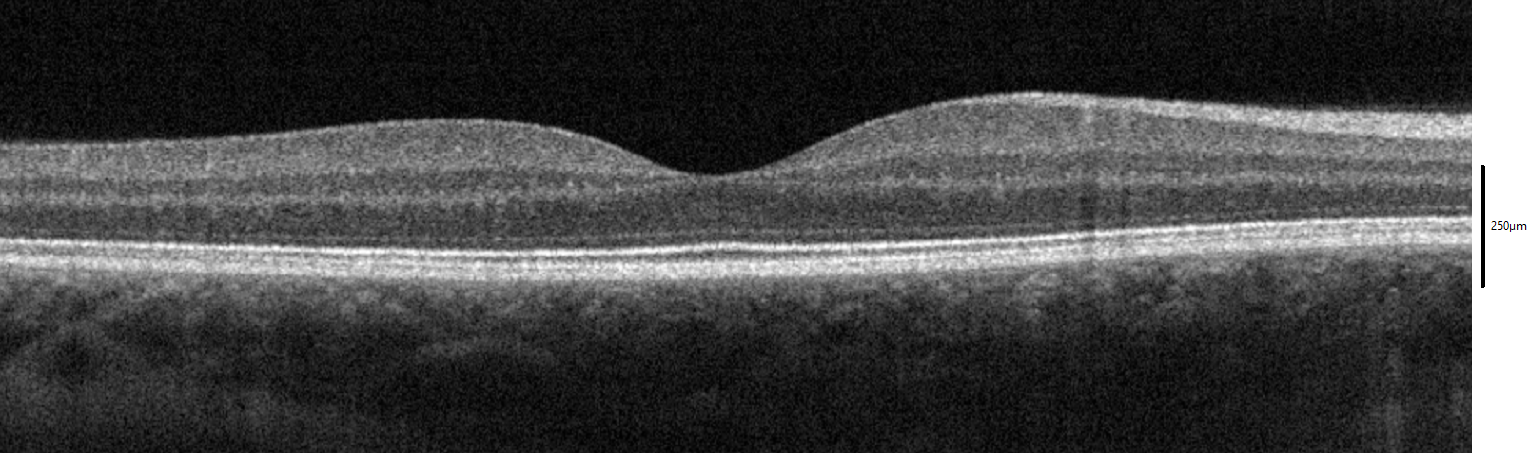
Spectral-Domain OCT macula cross-section scan.

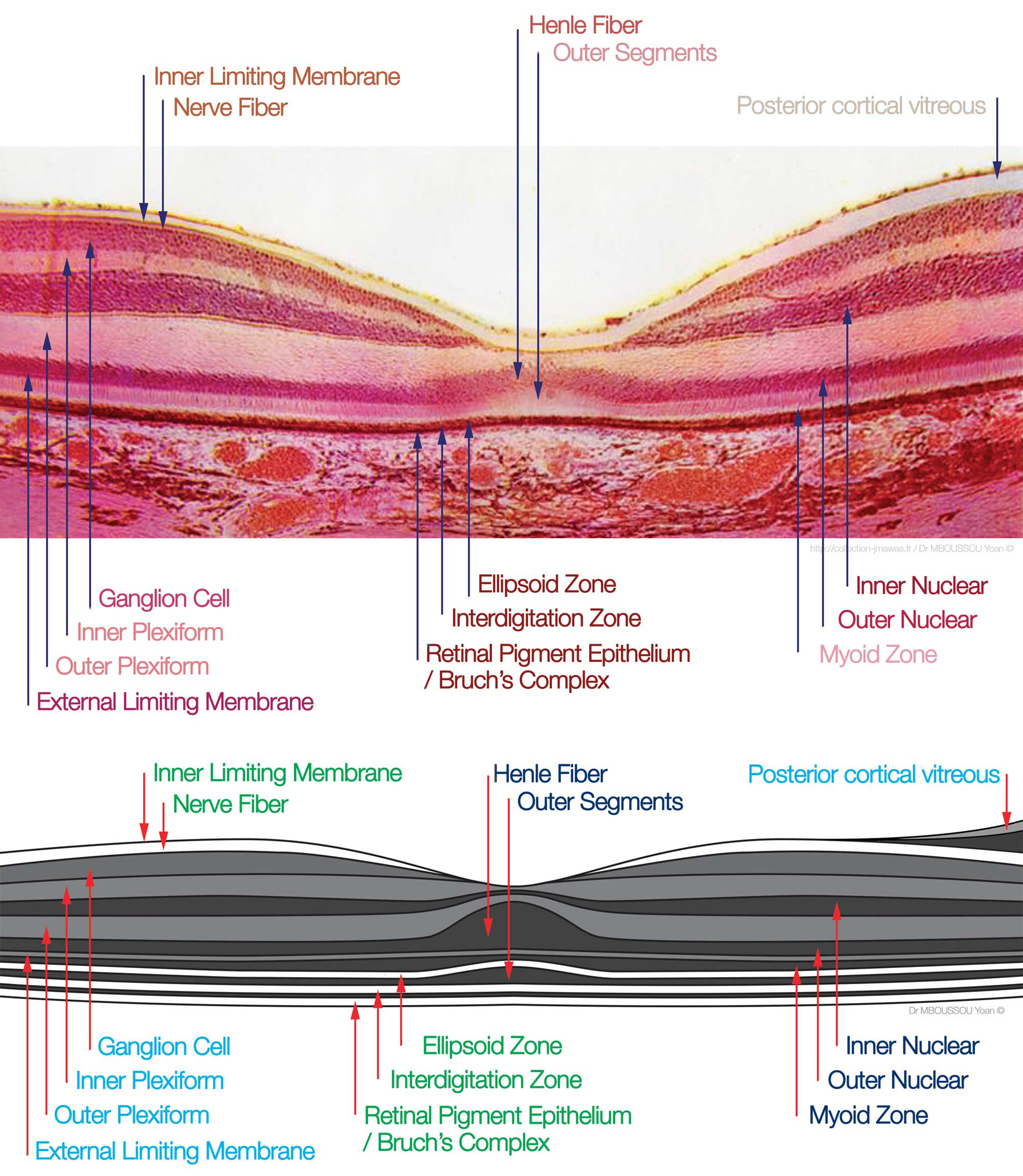
macula histology (OCT)

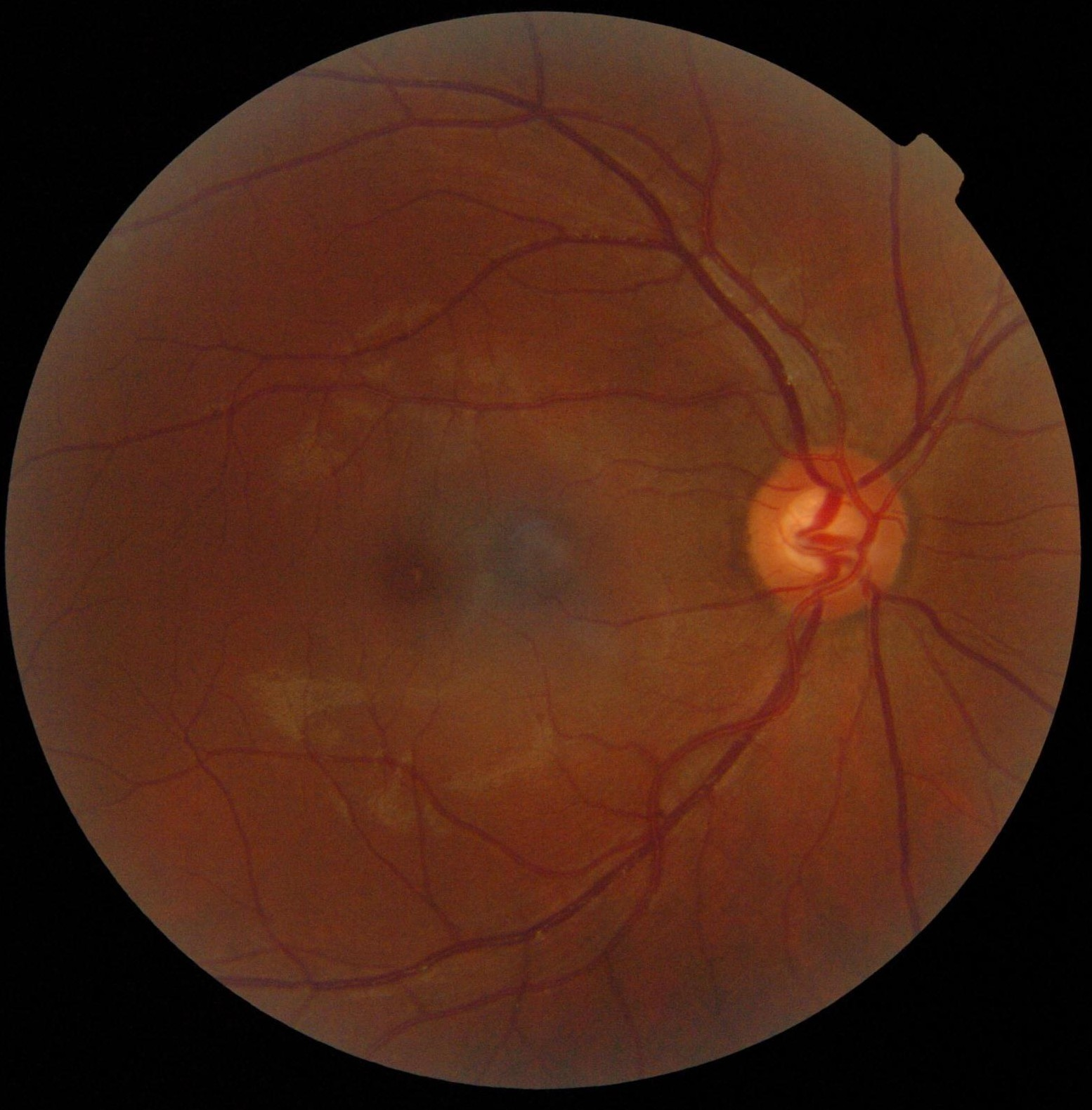
A fundus photograph showing the macula as a spot to the left. The optic disc is the area on the right where blood vessels converge. The grey, more diffuse spot in the centre is a shadow artifact.

== See also ==
- Eye movement in reading
- Eye movement in music reading
- Fixation (visual)
- Optical coherence tomography (OCT)
