= Acentric fragment =

Chromosome segment without a centromere

An acentric fragment is a segment of a chromosome that lacks a centromere.

Because the centromere is the point of attachment for the mitotic apparatus, acentric fragments are not evenly distributed to the daughter cells in cell division (mitosis and meiosis). As a result, one of the daughters will lack the acentric fragment.

Lack of the acentric fragment in one of the daughter cells may have deleterious consequences, depending on the function of the DNA in this region of the chromosome. In the case of a haploid organism or a gamete, it will be fatal to one of the daughter cells if essential DNA is contained in the lost DNA segment. In the case of a diploid organism, the daughter cell lacking the acentric fragment will show expression of any recessive genes found in the homologous chromosome. Developmental geneticists look for cells and cell lineages lacking unpaired chromosome segments produced this way as a means of identifying essential genes for specific functions.

Acentric fragments are commonly generated by chromosome-breaking events, such as irradiation. Such acentric fragments are unequally distributed between the daughter cells after cell division. Acentric fragments can also be produced when an inverted segment is present in one member of a chromosome pair. In that case, a crossover event will result in one chromosome with two centromeres and an acentric fragment. The acentric fragment will be lost as explained above, and chromosomes with two centromeres will break unevenly during mitosis, resulting in one daughter lacking essential genes.

== See also ==
- Metacentric
- Submetacentric
- Acrocentric
- Telocentric
