= Foveola =

Part of the eye

Details

Identifiers
- Latin: foveola
- TA98: A15.2.04.023
- TA2: 6786
- FMA: 77666

The foveola is located within a region called the macula, a yellowish, cone photoreceptor filled portion of the human retina. Approximately 0.35 mm in diameter, the foveola lies in the center of the fovea and contains only cone cells and a cone-shaped zone of Müller cells. In this region the cone receptors are found to be longer, slimmer, and more densely packed than anywhere else in the retina, thus allowing that region to have the potential to have the highest visual acuity in the eye.

The center of the foveola is a small (150-200μm) center of the floor of the foveola; features elongated cones, and is the observed point corresponding to the normal light reflex but not solely responsible for this light reflex.

== Research ==
The anatomy of the foveola was reinvestigated. Serial semithin and ultrathin sections, and focused ion beam (FIB) tomography were prepared from 32 foveolae from monkeys (Macaca fascicularis) and humans. Serial sections and FIB analysis were then used to construct 3D models of central Müller and photoreceptor cells.

It was discovered that in monkeys, outer segments of central foveolar cones are twice as long as those from parafoveal cones and do not run completely parallel to the incident light. Unique Müller cells are present in the central foveolae (area of 200 μm in diameter) of humans and monkeys.

Photograph of the retina of the human eye, with overlay diagrams showing the positions and sizes of the macula, fovea, and optic disc

== Additional images ==
Schematic diagram of the macula lutea of the retina, showing perifovea, parafovea, fovea, and clinical macula

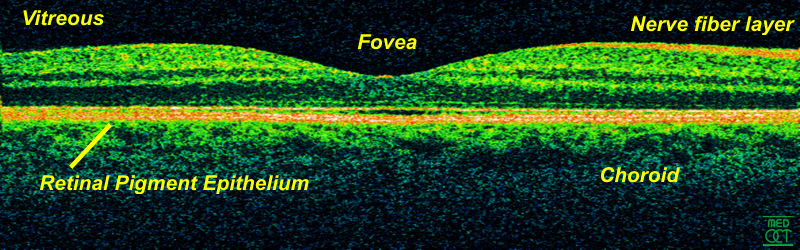
Time-Domain OCT of the macular area of a retina at 800 nm, axial resolution 3 μm

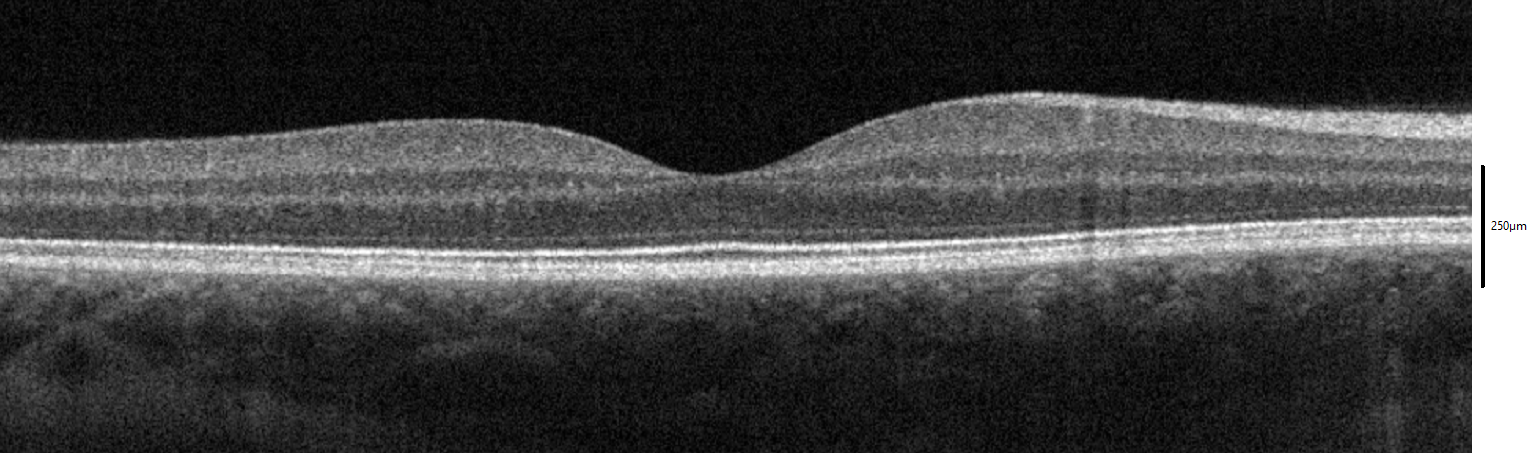
Spectral-Domain OCT macula cross-section scan.

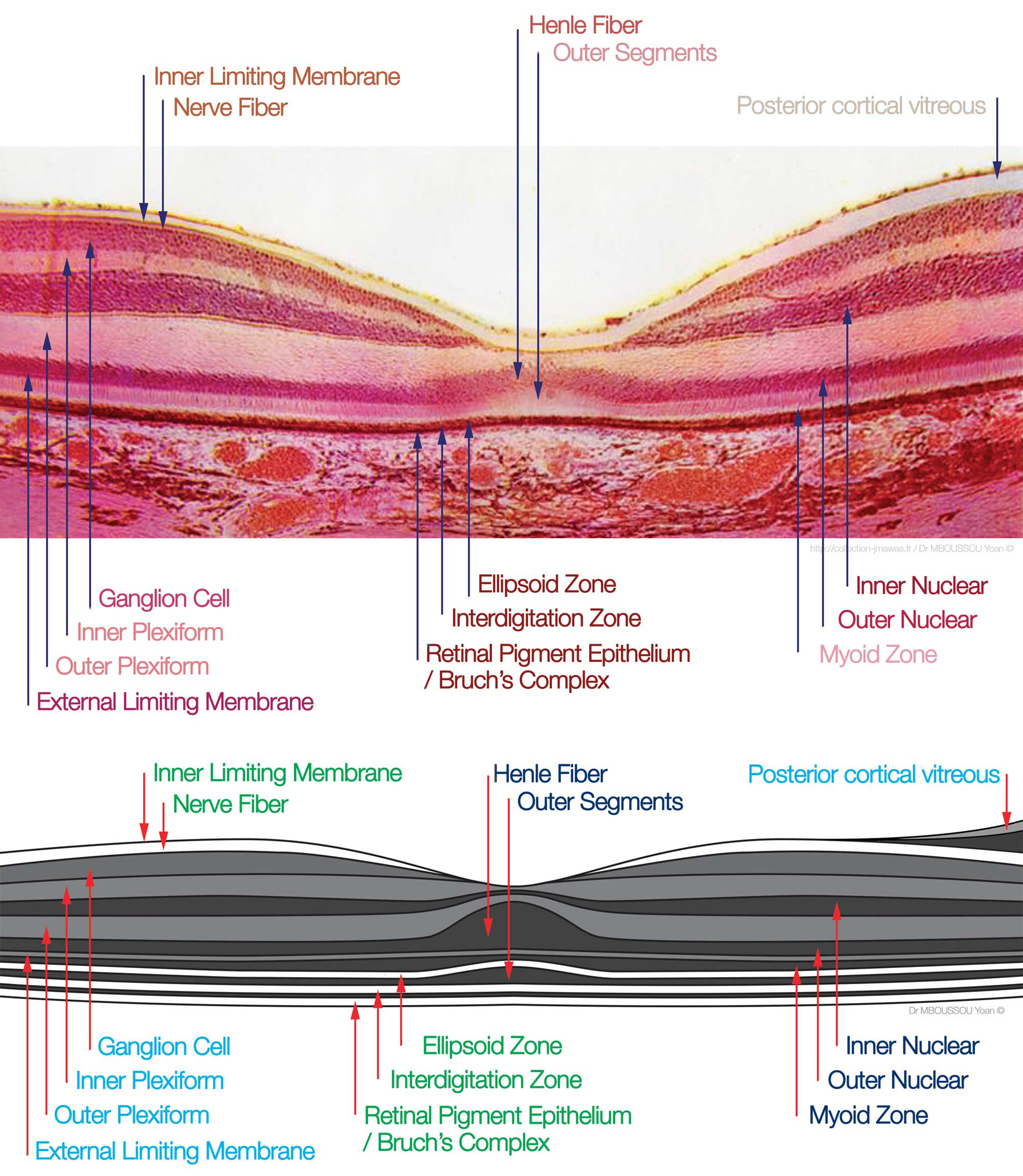
macula histology (OCT)

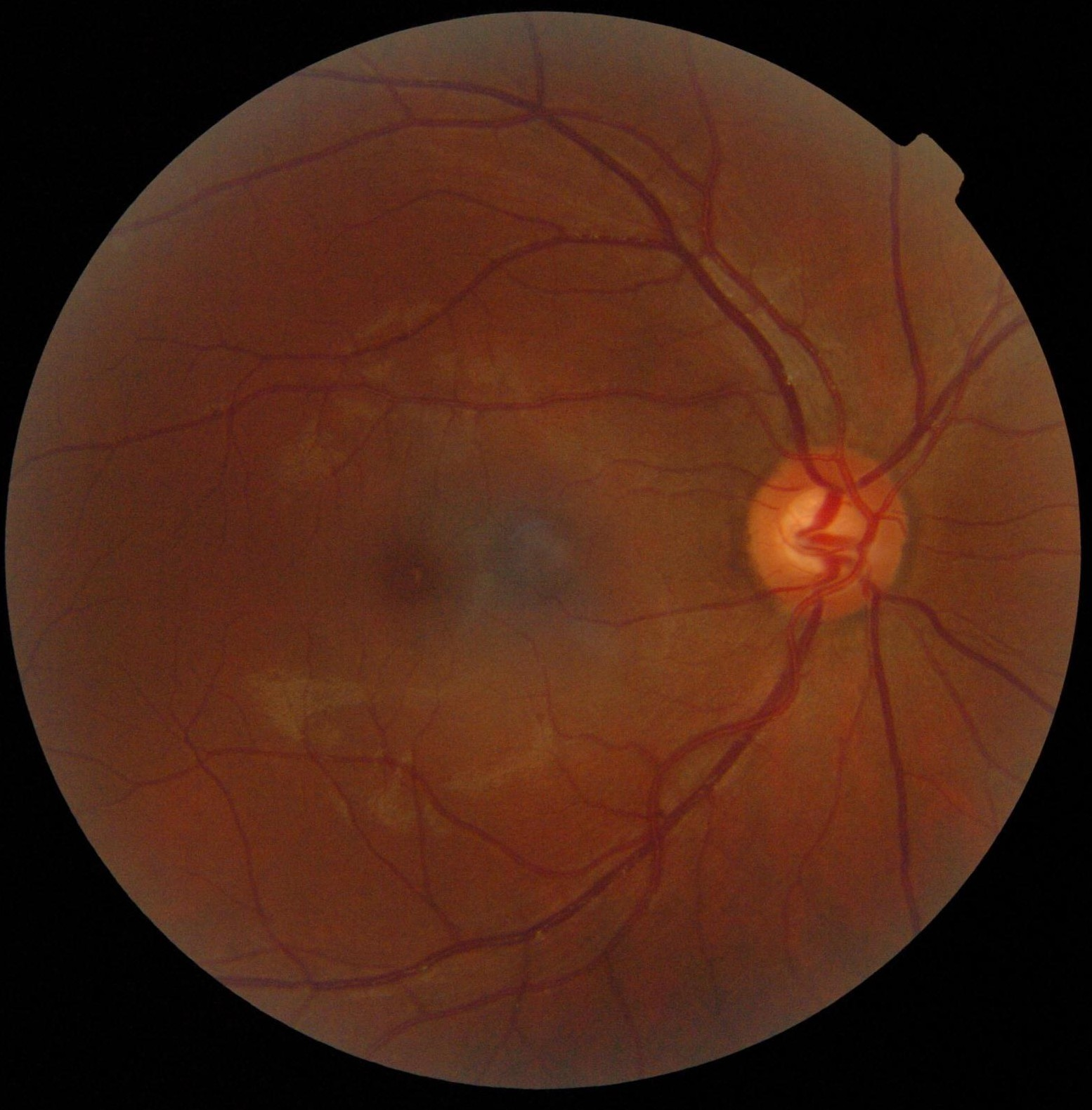
A fundus photograph showing the macula as a spot to the left. The optic disc is the area on the right where blood vessels converge. The grey, more diffuse spot in the centre is a shadow artifact.
