= Tatsuji Inouye =

Japanese ophthalmologist

Tatsuji Inouye (1881 – 1976) was a Japanese ophthalmologist who studied soldiers wounded during the Russo-Japanese War and is known for his contribution to delineating cortical representation of the visual field, especially in the striate cortex. By comparing the entrance and exit wounds of bullets in the soldiers' heads to their visual deficits (scotomas), he was able to map which portions of the cortex correspond to which portions of the visual field. Importantly, he showed that more cortical area is devoted to the representation of the centre of the visual field compared than to the periphery. He was born in Tokyo and studied medicine at the University of Tokyo. He published his finding first in Leipzig in 1909.
