= Horizontal eccentricity =

In vision, degrees of visual angle from the center of the eye

Horizontal eccentricity refers to the horizontal axis, measured in degrees, along the visual field. The blind spot extends from an eccentricity d_{1} to eccentricity d_{2} in temporal direction from the fovea. The size of the blind spot can be calculated as

$$\arctan \left(\frac{d_2-d_1}{d_1}\right) - \arctan \left(\frac{d_2-d_1}{d_2}\right).$$
