= Fovea centralis =

Small pit in the retina of the eye responsible for all central vision

- Schematic diagram of the human eye, with the fovea at the bottom. It shows a horizontal section through the right eye.

Details

Identifiers
- Latin: fovea centralis
- MeSH: D005584
- TA98: A15.2.04.022
- TA2: 6785
- FMA: 58658

The fovea centralis is a small, central pit composed of closely packed cones in the eye. It is located in the center of the macula lutea of the retina.

The fovea is responsible for sharp central vision (also called foveal vision), which is necessary in humans for activities for which visual detail is of primary importance, such as reading and driving. The fovea is surrounded by the parafovea belt and the perifovea outer region.

The parafovea is the intermediate belt, where the ganglion cell layer is composed of more than five layers of cells, as well as the highest density of cones; the perifovea is the outermost region where the ganglion cell layer contains two to four layers of cells, and is where visual acuity is below the optimum. The perifovea contains an even more diminished density of cones, having 12 per 100 micrometres versus 50 per 100 micrometres in the most central fovea. That, in turn, is surrounded by a larger peripheral area, which delivers highly compressed information of low resolution following the pattern of compression in foveated imaging.

Approximately half the nerve fibers in the optic nerve carry information from the fovea, while the remaining half carry information from the rest of the retina. The parafovea extends to a radius of 1.25 mm from the central fovea, and the perifovea is found at a 2.75 mm radius from the fovea centralis.

The term fovea comes from Latin fovea 'pit'.

The fovea centralis was named by German histologist Carl Bergmann.

== Structure ==
The fovea is a depression in the inner retinal surface, about 1.5 mm wide, the photoreceptor layer of which is entirely cones and which is specialized for maximum visual acuity. Within the fovea is a region of 0.5mm diameter called the foveal avascular zone (an area without any blood vessels). This allows the light to be sensed without any dispersion or loss. This anatomy is responsible for the depression in the center of the fovea. The foveal pit is surrounded by the foveal rim that contains the neurons displaced from the pit. This is the thickest part of the retina.

The fovea is located in a small avascular zone and receives most of its oxygen from the vessels in the choroid, which is across the retinal pigment epithelium and Bruch's membrane. The high spatial density of cones along with the absence of blood vessels at the fovea accounts for the high visual acuity capability at the fovea.

The center of the fovea is the foveola – about 0.35 mm in diameter – or central pit where only cone photoreceptors are present and there are virtually no rods. The central fovea consists of very compact cones, thinner and more rod-like in appearance than cones elsewhere. These cones are very densely packed (in a hexagonal pattern). Starting at the outskirts of the fovea, however, rods gradually appear, and the absolute density of cone receptors progressively decreases.

In 2018, the anatomy of the foveola was reinvestigated, and it was discovered that outer segments from the central foveolar cones of monkeys are not straight and twice as long as those from the parafovea.

=== Size ===
The size of the fovea is relatively small with regard to the rest of the retina. However, it is the only area in the retina where 20/20 vision is attainable, and is the area where fine detail and colour can be distinguished.

=== Properties ===
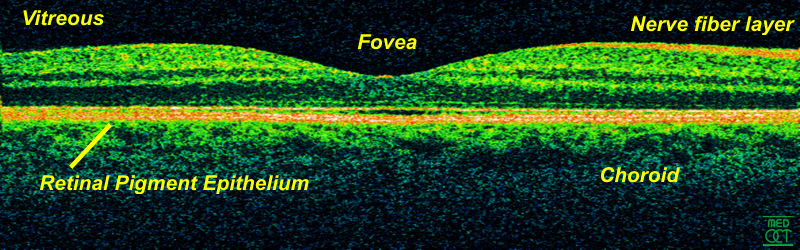
Time-domain OCT of the macular area of a retina at 800 nm, axial resolution 3 μm

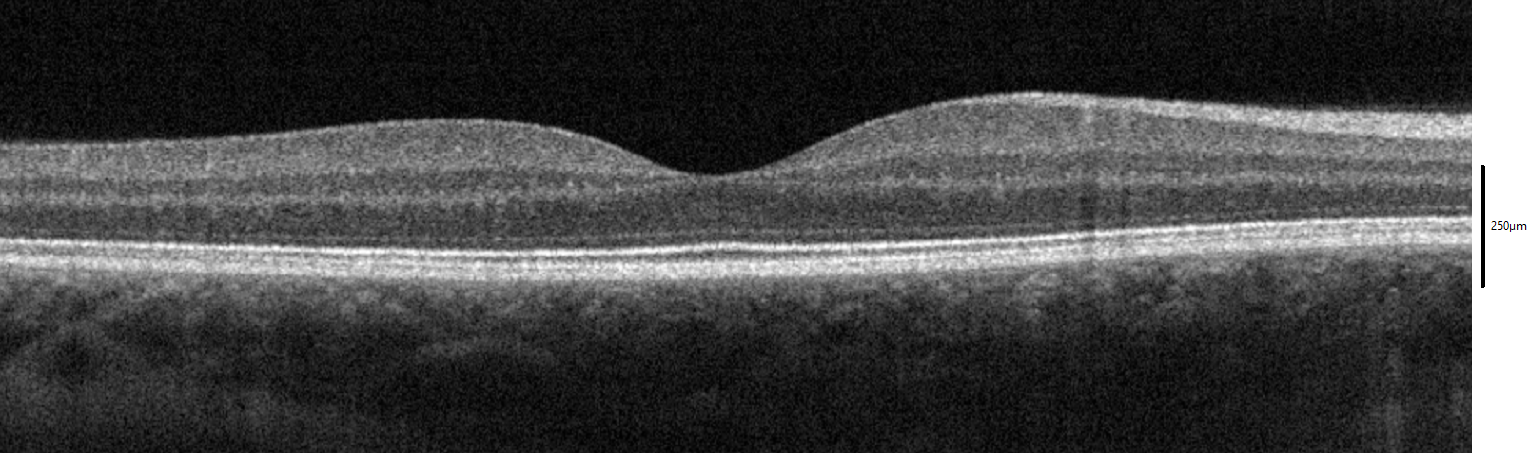
Spectral-domain OCT macula cross-section scan

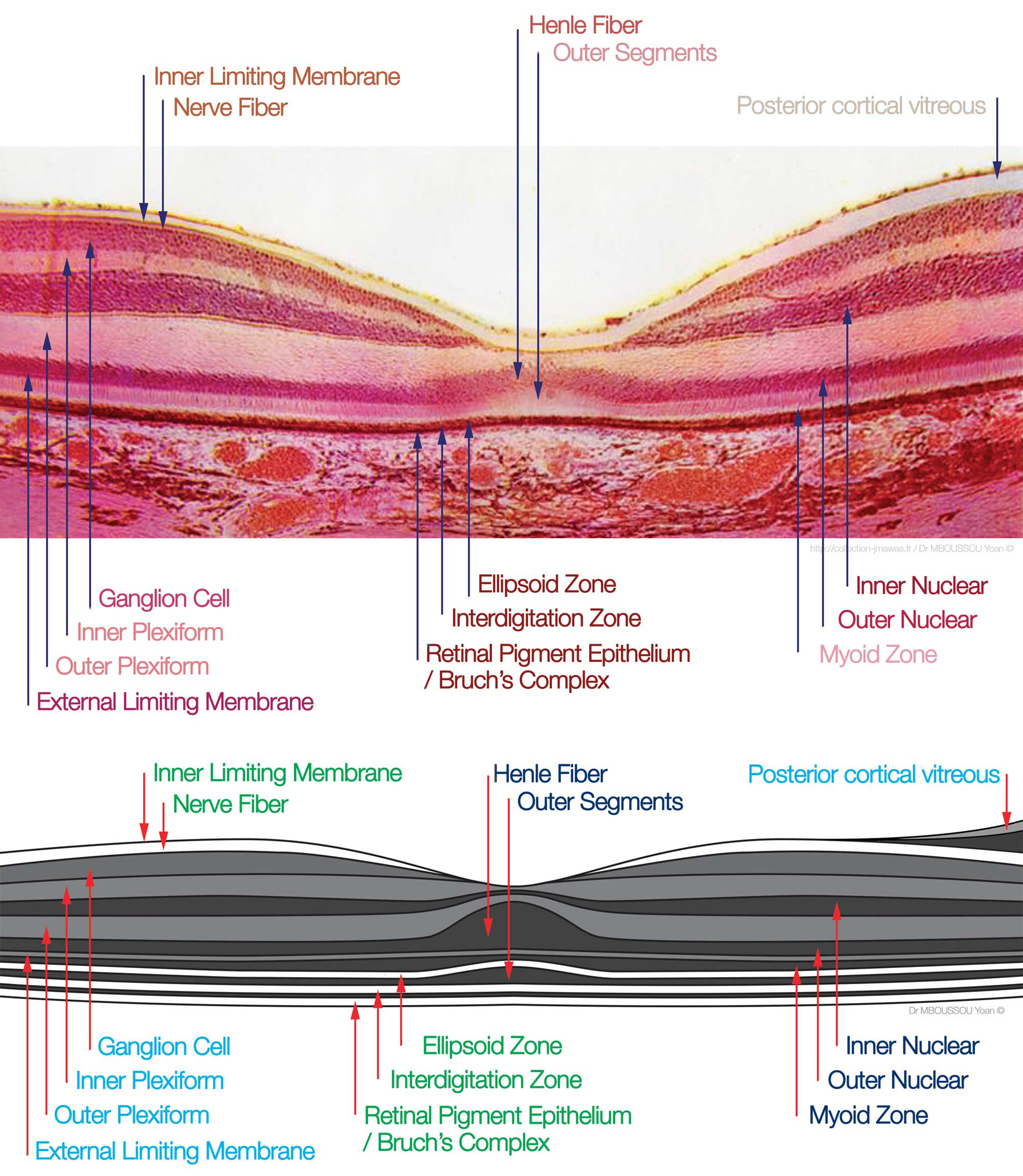
Macula histology (OCT)

Diagram showing the relative acuity of the left human eye (horizontal section) in degrees from the fovea

Photograph of the retina of the human eye, with overlay diagrams showing the positions and sizes of the macula, fovea, and optic disc

- Anatomical macula / macula lutea / area centralis (clinical: posterior pole):
  - Diameter = 5.5 mm (~3.5 disc-diameters) (about 18 deg of VF)
  - Demarcated by the superior and inferior temporal arterial arcades.
  - Has an elliptical shape horizontally.
  - Histologically the only region of the retina where GCL has >1 layer of ganglion cells
  - Yellowish appearance = luteal pigments (xanthophyll and beta-carotenoid (beta-carotene) in the outer nuclear layers inward.
- Anatomical perifovea:
  - Region between parafovea (2.5 mm) and edge of macula
  - GCL has 2–4 layers of cells.
  - 12 cones / 100 μm
- Anatomical parafovea:
  - Diameter = 2.5 mm.
  - GCL has >5 layers of cells, and highest density of cones
- Anatomical fovea / fovea centralis (clinical: macula)
  - Area of depression in the centre of the macula lutea.
  - Diameter = 1.5 mm (~1 disc-diameter) (about 5 deg of VF)
- Foveal avascular zone (FAZ)
  - Diameter = 0.5 mm (about 1.5 deg of VF)
  - Approximately equal to the foveola
- Anatomical foveola (clinical: fovea)
  - Diameter = 0.35 mm (about 1 deg of VF)
  - the central floor of depression of fovea centralis
  - 50 cones / 100 μm
  - Highest visual acuity
- Anatomical umbo
  - Represents the precise center of the macula
  - Diameter = 0.15 mm
  - Corresponds to the clinical light reflex

== Function ==
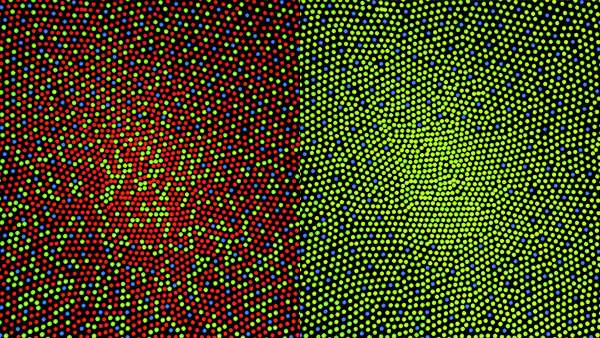
Illustration of the distribution of cone cells in the fovea of an individual with normal color vision (left), and a color blind (protanopic) retina. Note that the center of the fovea holds very few blue-sensitive cones.

In the primate fovea (including humans) the ratios of ganglion cells to photoreceptors is about 2.5; almost every ganglion cell receives data from a single cone, and each cone feeds onto between one and 3 ganglion cells. Therefore, the acuity of foveal vision is limited only by the density of the cone mosaic, and the fovea is the area of the eye with the highest sensitivity to fine details. Cones in the central fovea express opsins that are sensitive to green and red light. These cones are the 'midget' pathways that also underpin high acuity functions of the fovea.

The fovea is employed for accurate vision in the direction where it is pointed. It comprises less than 1% of retinal size but takes up over 50% of the visual cortex in the brain. The fovea sees only the central two degrees of the visual field, (approximately twice the width of your thumbnail at arm's length). If an object is large and thus covers a large angle, the eyes must constantly shift their gaze to subsequently bring different portions of the image into the fovea (as in reading). Foveal fixation is also considered as a overt form of attention which allows to focus sensory processing resources on the most relevant sources of information. Also, foveated vision may allow speeding up learning of specific visual tasks by disregarding not relevant context and focusing on the relevant information only with lower dimensionality.

Distribution of rods and cones along a line passing through the fovea and the blind spot of a human eye

Since the fovea does not have rods, it is not sensitive to dim lighting. Hence, in order to observe dim stars, astronomers use averted vision, looking out of the side of their eyes where the density of rods is greater, and hence dim objects are more easily visible.

The fovea has a high concentration of the yellow carotenoid pigments lutein and zeaxanthin. They are concentrated in the Henle fiber layer (photoreceptor axons that go radially outward from the fovea) and to a lesser extent in the cones. They are believed to play a protective role against the effects of high intensities of blue light which can damage the sensitive cones. The pigments also enhance the acuity of the fovea by reducing the sensitivity of the fovea to short wavelengths and counteracting the effect of chromatic aberration. This is also accompanied by a lower density of blue cones at the center of the fovea. The maximum density of blue cones occurs in a ring about the fovea. Consequently, the maximum acuity for blue light is lower than that of other colours and occurs approximately 1° off center.

In the fovea, the cone signals split into two separate midget pathways, each leading to the ON or OFF signal, channeled through a bipolar and ganglion cell for each cone. This can also be used for chromatically opponent pathways. Alternatively, there is a diffuse pathway, where the cone signals merge into two pathways, namely a pair of ON and OFF bipolar cells and parasol ganglion cells.

=== Angular size of foveal cones ===
On average, each square millimeter (mm) of the fovea contains approximately 147,000 cone cells, or 383 cones per millimeter. The average focal length of the eye, i.e. the distance between the lens and fovea, is 17.1 mm. From these values, one can calculate the average angle of view of a single sensor (cone cell), which is approximately 31.46 arc seconds.

The following is a table of pixel densities required at various distances so that there is one pixel per 31.5 arc seconds:

Example object	Distance from eye assumed	Absolute pixel density to match avg. foveal cone density (20/10.5 vision) in PPI (px/cm)
Phone or tablet	10 inches (25.4 cm)	655.6 (258.1)
Laptop screen	2 feet (61 cm)	273.2 (107.6)
42" (1.07 m) 16:9 HDTV, 30° view	5.69 feet (1.73 m)	96.0 (37.8)

Peak cone density varies highly between individuals, such that peak values below 100,000 cones/mm^{2} and above 324,000 cones/mm^{2} are not uncommon. Assuming average focal lengths, this suggests that individuals with both high cone densities and perfect optics may resolve pixels with an angular size of 21.2 arc seconds, requiring PPI values at least 1.5 times those shown above in order for images not to appear pixelated.

Individuals with 20/20 (6/6 m) vision, defined as the ability to discern a 5x5 pixel letter that has an angular size of 5 arc minutes, cannot see pixels smaller than 60 arc seconds. In order to resolve a pixel the size of 31.5 and 21.2 arc seconds, an individual would need 20/10.5 (6/3.1 m) and 20/7.1 (6/2.1 m) vision, respectively. To find the PPI values discernible at 20/20, simply divide the values in the above table by the visual acuity ratio (e.g. 96 PPI / (20/10.5 vision) = 50.4 PPI for 20/20 vision).

=== Entoptic effects in the fovea ===
The presence of the pigment in the radially arranged axons of the Henle fiber layer causes it to be dichroic and birefringent to blue light. This effect is visible through the Haidinger's brush when the fovea is pointed to a polarized light source.

The combined effects of the macular pigment and the distribution of short wavelength cones results in the fovea having a lower sensitivity to blue light (blue light scotoma). Though this is not visible under normal circumstances due to "filling in" of information by the brain, under certain patterns of blue light illumination, a dark spot is visible at the point of focus. Also, if mixture of red and blue light is viewed (by viewing white light through a dichroic filter), the point of foveal focus will have a central red spot surrounded by a few red fringes. This is called the Maxwell's spot after James Clerk Maxwell who discovered it.

=== Bifoveal fixation ===
In binocular vision, the two eyes converge to enable bifoveal fixation, which is necessary for achieving high stereoacuity.

In contrast, in a condition known as anomalous retinal correspondence, the brain associates the fovea of one eye with an extrafoveal area of the other eye.

== Other animals ==
The fovea is also a pit in the surface of the retinas of many types of fish, reptiles, and birds. Among mammals, it is found in its most developed form only in Haplorhine primates, although a more rudimentary fovea-like structure exists in some diurnal lemurs. The retinal fovea takes slightly different forms in different types of animals. For example, in primates, cone photoreceptors line the base of the foveal pit, the cells that elsewhere in the retina form more superficial layers having been displaced away from the foveal region during late fetal and early postnatal life. Other foveae may show only a reduced thickness in the inner cell layers, rather than an almost complete absence.

Most birds have a single fovea, but hawks, swallows, hummingbirds and kingfishers have a double fovea. The second is called the temporal fovea, which enables them to track slow movements. The density of cones in a typical bird's fovea has 400,000 cones per square millimeter, but some birds can reach a density of 1,000,000 cones per square millimeter (e.g., Common Buzzard).

== Additional images ==
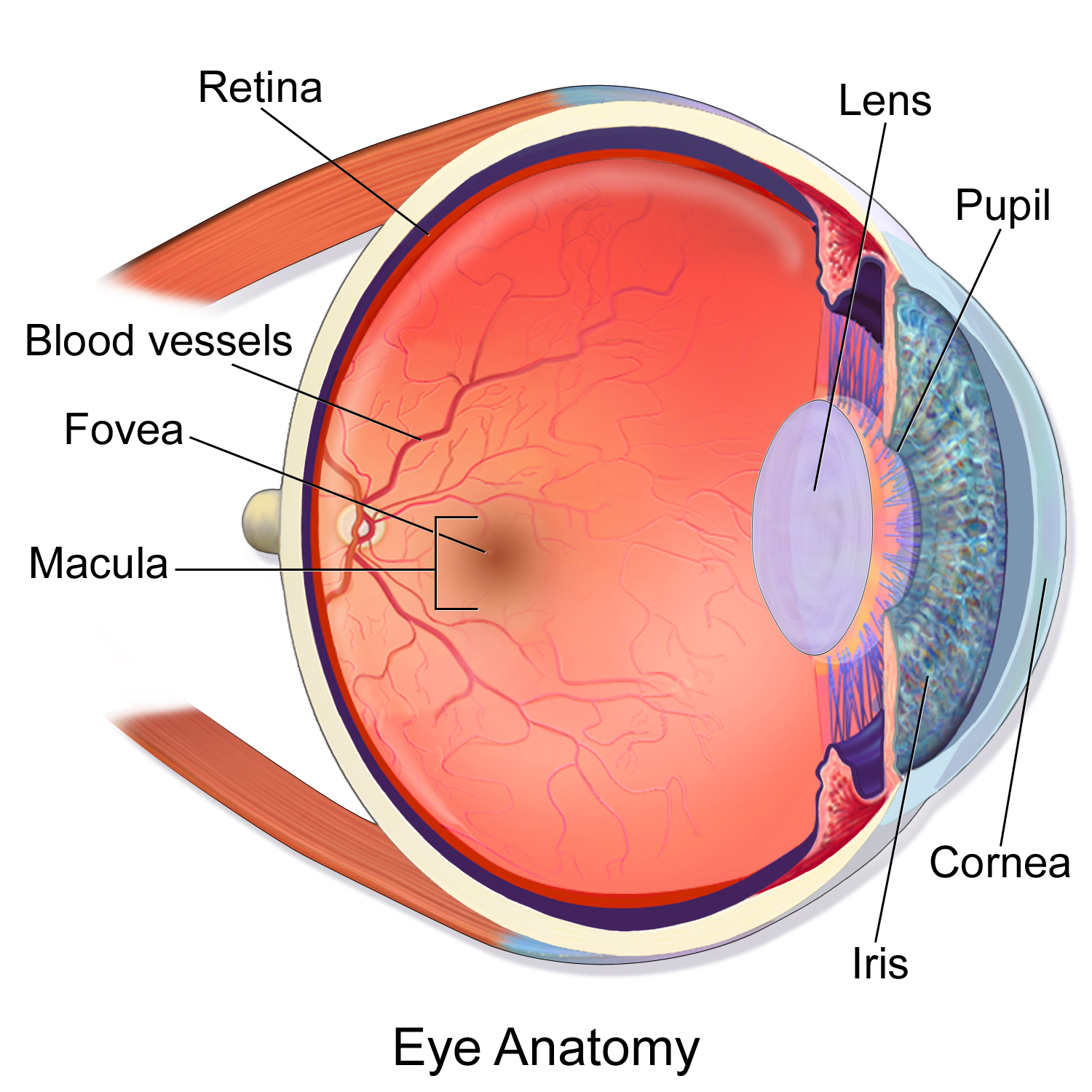
Illustration showing main structures of the eye including the fovea

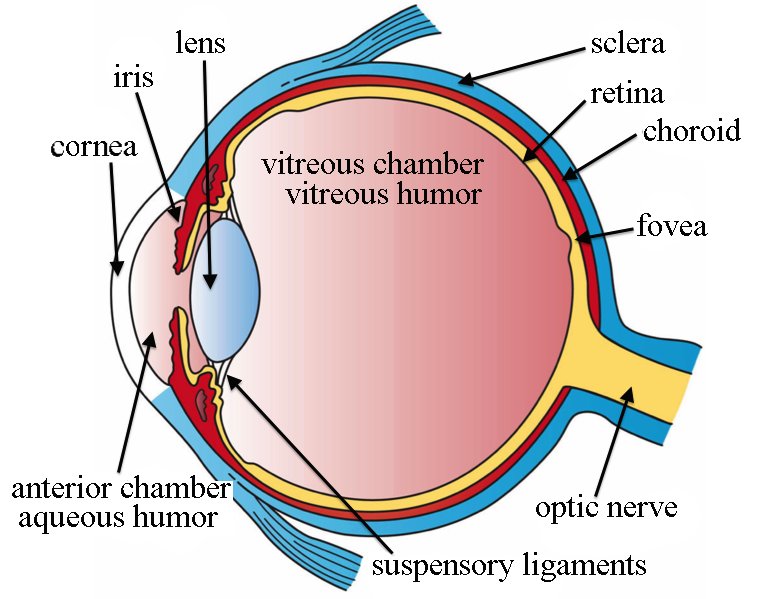
Structures of the eye labeled

This image shows another labeled view of the structures of the eye.

Schematic diagram of the macula lutea of the retina, showing perifovea, parafovea, fovea, and clinical macula

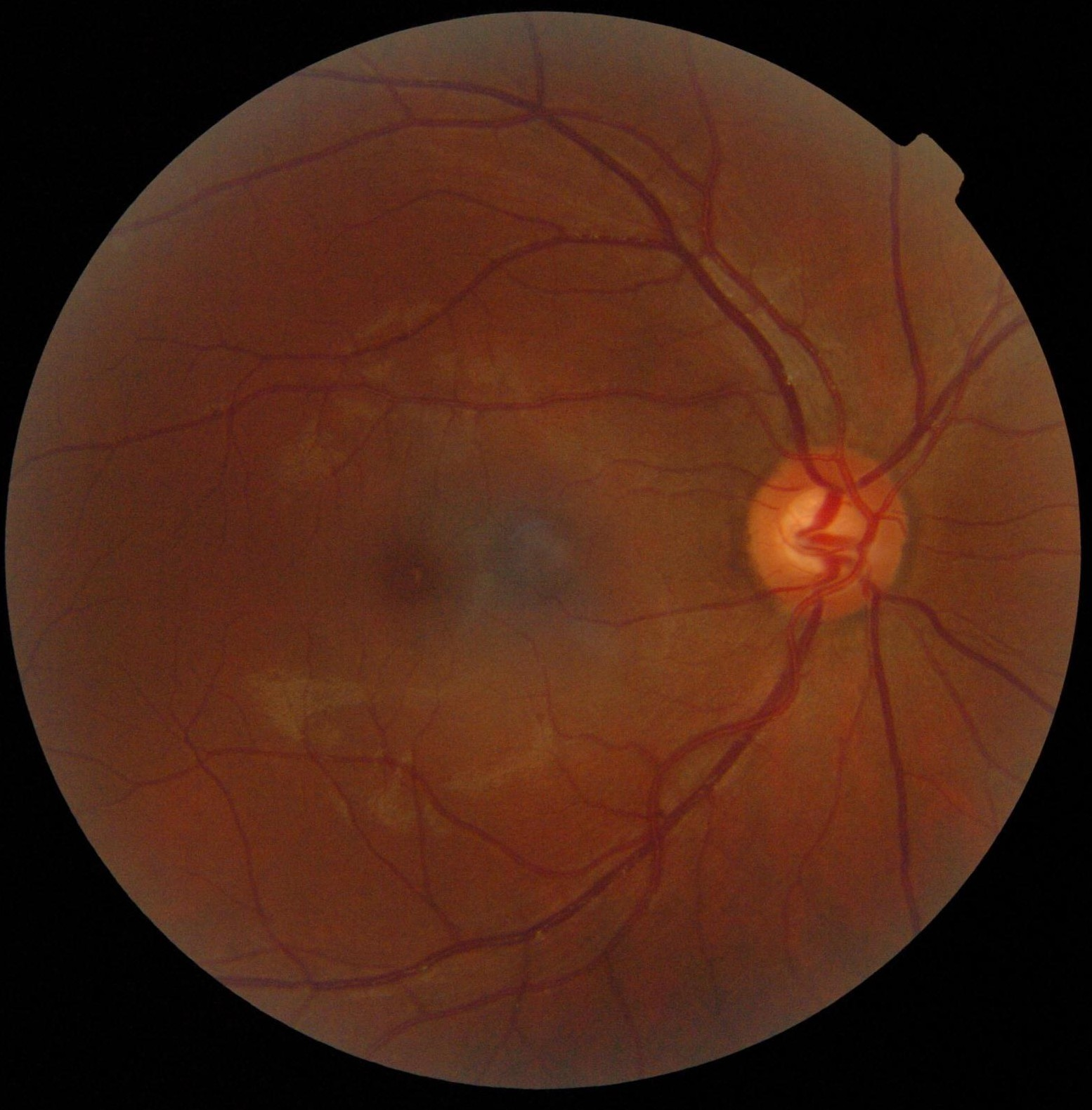
A fundus photograph showing the macula as a spot to the left. The optic disc is the area on the right where blood vessels converge. The grey, more diffuse spot in the centre is a shadow artifact.

== See also ==
- Eye movement
- Gaze-contingency paradigm
- Macular degeneration
- Foveated imaging
