= Chemoaffinity hypothesis =

Theory that neurons initially form connections based on molecular markers

In neuroscience, the chemoaffinity hypothesis states that neurons make connections with their targets based on interactions with specific molecular markers and, therefore, that the initial wiring diagram of an organism is (indirectly) determined by its genotype. The markers are generated during cellular differentiation and aid not only with synaptogenesis, but also act as guidance cues for their respective axon.

== Sperry's experiments ==
Roger Wolcott Sperry pioneered the inception of the chemoaffinity hypothesis following his 1960s experiments on the African clawed frog. He would remove the eye of a frog and reinsert it rotated upside-down—the visual nervous system would eventually repair itself, and the frog would exhibit inverted vision. In other words, the initial eye orientation is reversed such that the dorsal part of the eye becomes the ventral side, and the ventral side becomes the dorsal side; when a food source was put above the frog, the frog would extend its tongue downwards. In follow-up experiments, the eye was detached and rotated 180° like before, but additionally the optic nerve was cut—the results were identical.

Sperry hypothesized that each individual optic nerve and tectal neuron used some form of chemical marker to dictate the connectivity during development. Sperry reasoned that when the eye had been rotated, each optic fiber and tectal neuron possessed cytochemical labels that uniquely denoted their type and position, and thus optic fibers utilize these labels to selectively navigate to their matching target cell via a sort-of chemotaxis.

== See also ==
- Neural development
