= HTC Vive =

Virtual reality headset family

Vive
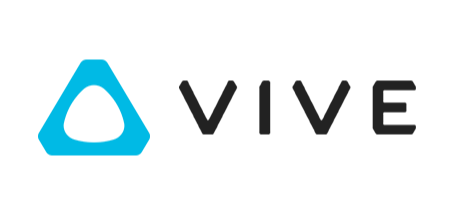
- Product type: Virtual reality devices
- Current owner: HTC
- Markets: Worldwide
- Website: www.vive.com

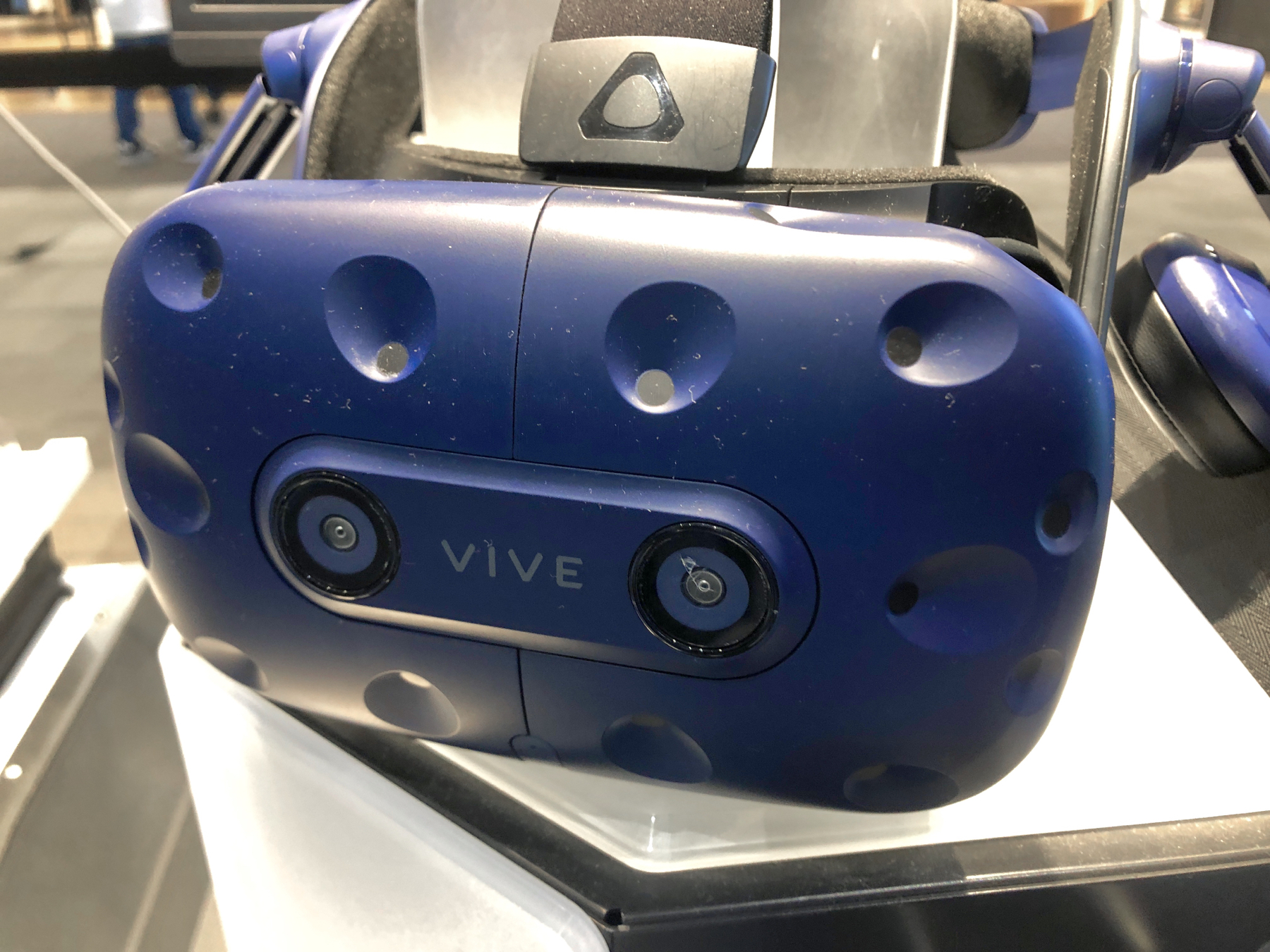
A HTC Vive Pro

HTC Vive is a line of virtual and mixed reality headsets produced by HTC Corporation. The brand currently encompasses headsets designed for use with personal computers as well as standalone headsets such as the Vive Focus line, Vive Flow glasses, and the Vive Elite XR headset.

The first-generation Vive was announced in 2015, as part of a collaboration with video game studio and distributor Valve Corporation, and implementing its VR software and hardware platform SteamVR; the first-generation consumer model was released in April 2016. It has since been succeeded by newer models with upgraded specifications. HTC has also released accessories that integrate with the Vive and SteamVR, including sensors for motion capture and facial capture.

Since 2021, HTC has targeted the Vive line towards the business and enterprise markets, moving away from the consumer market.

== Development ==
Prototypes of a Valve-produced virtual reality system were demonstrated during 2014. On 23 February 2015, Valve announced SteamVR and that it would demonstrate a "SteamVR hardware system" at the 2015 Game Developers Conference. HTC officially unveiled its device, Vive, during its Mobile World Congress keynote on 1 March 2015.

During his Immersed 2015 keynote, Chief Content Officer for HTC Phil Chen explained that he "stumbled upon VR" and later, HTC met Valve, which turned out to be "serendipity". Chen also explained that HTC and Valve don't have a clear dividing line between each of their responsibilities, and HTC is very much a partner in the research and development process.

== History ==
At the Mobile World Congress keynote, HTC and Valve announced plans for a consumer release by the end of 2015. Later, in December 2015, HTC stated that the consumer launch had been delayed to April 2016. At International CES in January 2016, HTC and Valve unveiled a near-final hardware revision of the device, known as HTC Vive Pre. Preorders started on 29 February 2016, with shipments beginning in April. In March, Valve and HTC announced that they also planned to distribute development models of the Vive for free to game developers who register online.

In June 2016, HTC announced the release of their 'Business Edition' of the Vive for US$1,200 which would include a Professional Use License, a 12-month Commercial Warranty, access to an exclusive support line, a 5-meter (16 ft) cable extension kit, and it included the Deluxe Audio Strap.

HTC announced an updated revision of the Vive known as the Vive Pro in January 2018, which featured a higher resolution display and other design tweaks for comfort. In 2019, HTC released the Vive Cosmos, which features inside-out motion tracking without external base stations, and also supports interchangeable faceplates with different functionality.

HTC Vive (first generation)
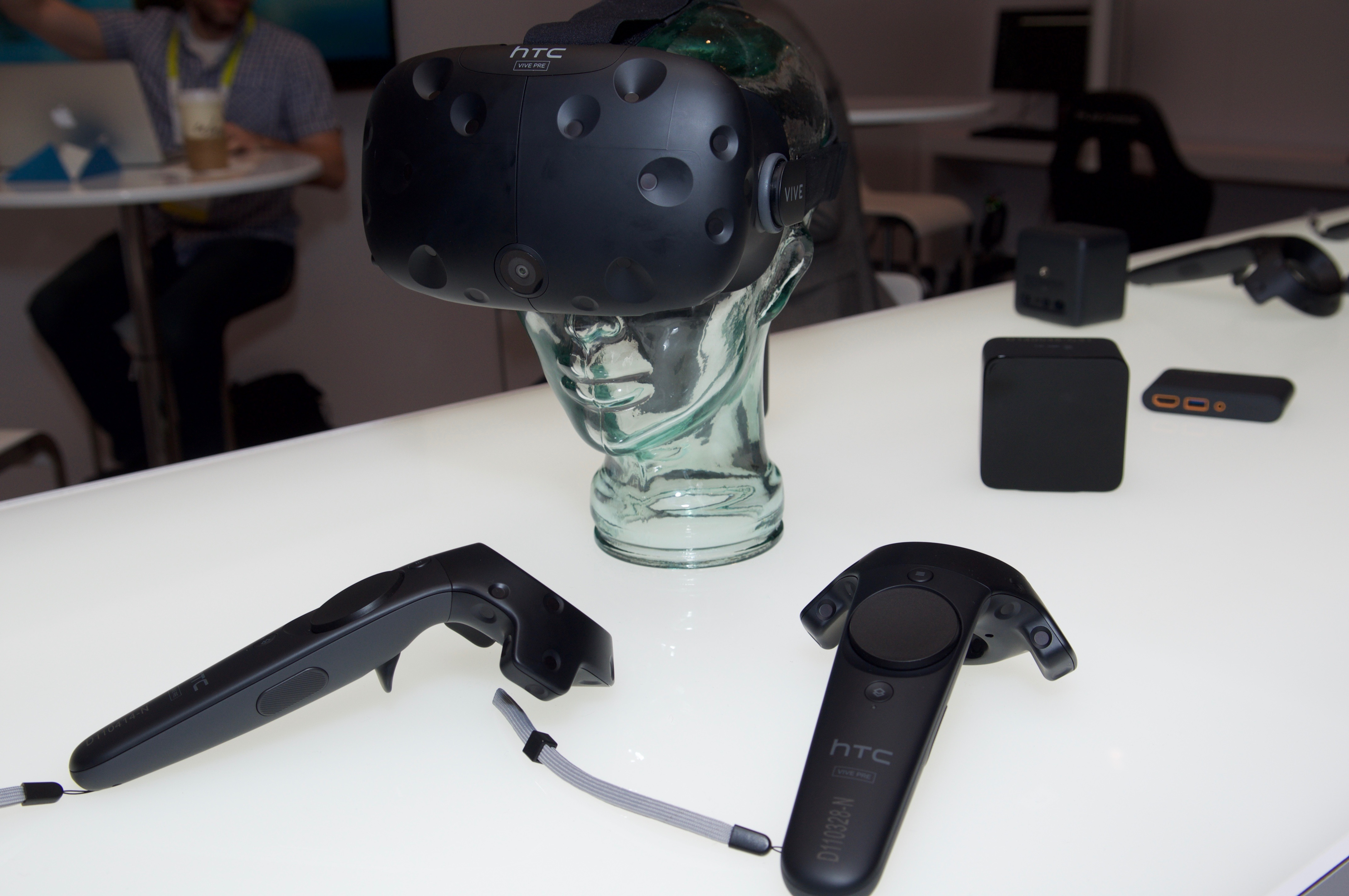
- An HTC Vive Pre head-mounted display with a camera near the bottom rim, two wireless handheld controllers, and two "Lighthouse" basestations
- Type: Virtual reality headset for room scale virtual reality
- Release date: 5 April 2016
- Manufacturer: HTC, with technology by Valve
- Display technology: PenTile OLED
- Resolution: 2160×1200 (1080×1200 per eye)
- Refresh rate: 90 Hz
- Field of view (Nominal): About 110 degrees
- Tracking system: Lighthouse (2 base stations emitting pulsed IR lasers)
- Input: Video/data/Bluetooth
- Weight: 470 grams (previously 555 grams)
- Platform/operating system: SteamVR running on Microsoft Windows in addition to Linux support, with macOS support coming
- Connection: 1× HDMI 1.4 or DisplayPort 1.2 and 1× USB 3.0
- Introductory price: US$799/£689
- Sound: 3.5 mm audio jack for headphones; Built-in microphone; Headphones will be sold separately from June 2017
- Controller input: SteamVR wireless motion tracked controllers
- Camera: Front-facing camera - enabling users to view the external world and a key component of the device’s 'chaperone' safety system.

== Hardware ==
HTC Vive implements "room-scale" virtual reality, whereby a user can walk freely around a play area rather than be constrained to a stationary position. The controllers and headset use a positional tracking system; multiple external base stations are installed in the play area, which each contain an array of LED lights, and two infrared lasers. The lasers are attached to rotating spinners which sweep the play area vertically and horizontally with timed pulses (similarly to a lighthouse, hence they are also colloquially referred to as "lighthouses"). The headsets, controllers, and other compatible accessories contain photosensors which detect the LED lights from the base stations, and then compare them with the timing of the laser sweeps in order to determine their relative position in 3D space.

The first-generation HTC Vive headset contains two OLED display panels with a resolution of 1080×1200 per-eye, with a refresh rate of 90 Hz and a 110 degree field of view. It contains a accelerometer, gyroscope and proximity sensor, and a front-facing camera used for the "Chaperone" feature, which can display the boundaries of the user's chosen perimeter or the view of the camera in order to help guide the user away from objects and walls in their play area.

The headset must be connected to a supported PC using a "link box", which contains USB 3.0, HDMI, and power connectors. The Vive initially required computers running Microsoft Windows. In February 2017, support was added for Linux, followed by support for macOS in June 2017. However, SteamVR support for macOS was discontinued by Valve in 2020, with the company stating that it planned to focus solely on Linux and Windows moving forward.

=== Controllers ===
The Vive uses motion controllers referred to as "wands", which contain circular trackpads similar to the Steam Controller (2015), a side "grip" button, a trigger, and an infrared sensor ring for tracking the base stations. They are rated for a battery life of six hours. Later models of the wand controllers implement SteamVR 2.0 tracking, and are colored in blue to match the Vive Pro.

The Vive Cosmos ships with a different controller due to its inside out tracking; unlike the "wand" controllers, they are nearly identical in design to the Oculus Touch controllers, with each controller having two face buttons, an analog stick, a trigger and bumper, and a grip button.

== Games and software ==
Most HTC Vive headsets implement the SteamVR platform, and support all games and software which use it. HTC also operates its own first-party storefront known as Viveport, which includes a subscription-based service with unlimited access to participating games, as well as curated storefronts intended for commercial clients such as entertainment centers and workplaces.

In 2022, HTC unveiled a platform known as Viverse, which is designed to integrate first and third-party metaverse, VR, collaboration, and Web3 platforms.

== Product lines ==
=== Vive Pro ===
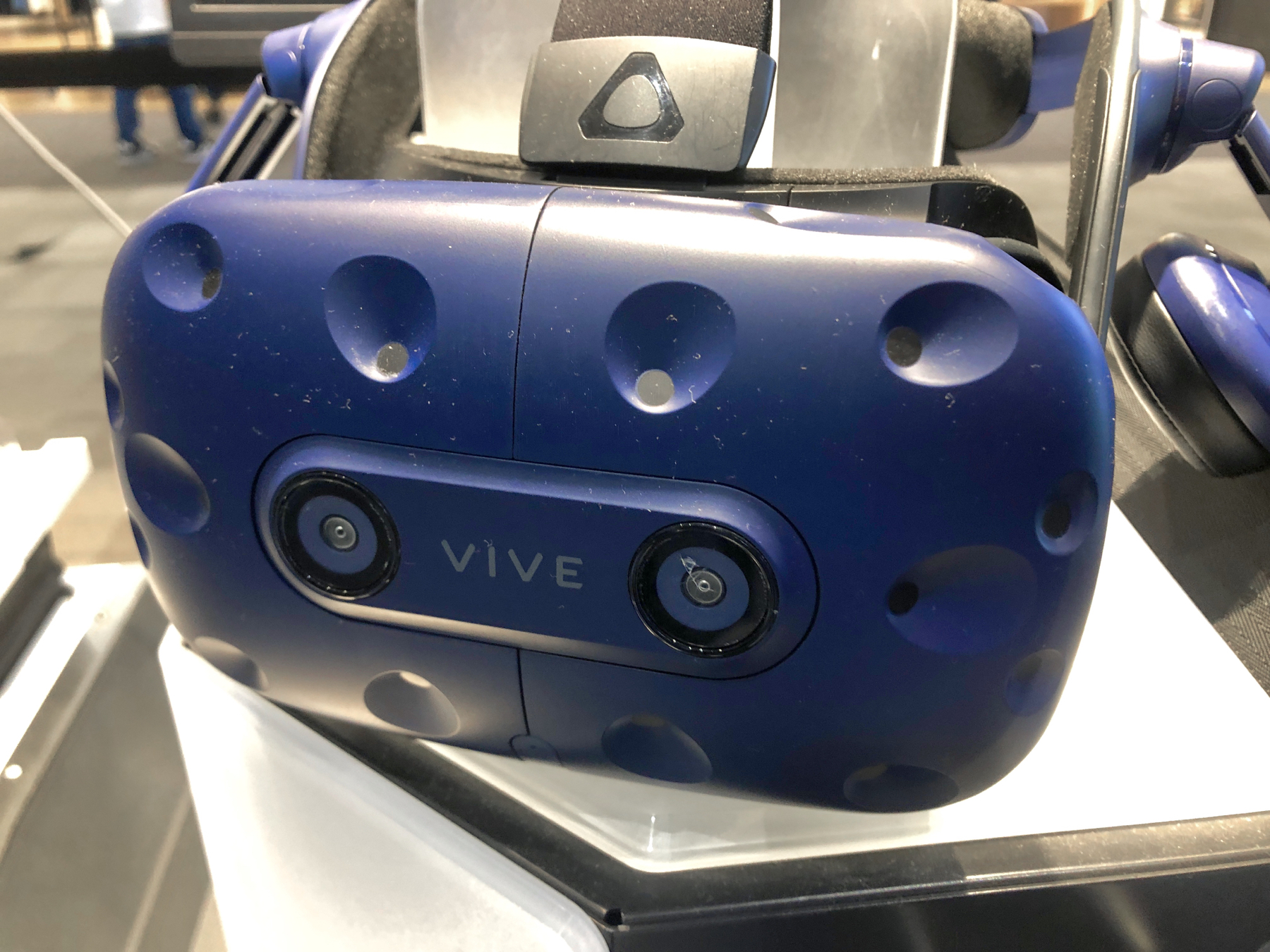
An HTC Vive Pro

On 8 January 2018, HTC unveiled the HTC Vive Pro, an updated version of the first-generation Vive. It features higher-resolution OLED displays, now at 1440×1600 resolution per-eye (a 78% increase in resolution), along with a second outward-facing camera, a microphone for noise cancellation analysis, and a refreshed design with a more "balanced" form, lighter weight, and a strap with over-ear headphones and a sizing dial (similar to the "Deluxe Audio Strap" accessory for the first-generation model). It uses DisplayPort as a display connection instead of HDMI.

The Vive Pro was sold alongside the original HTC Vive as a high-end model; initially, the headset was sold standalone without base stations or controllers, as it was intended as a drop-in replacement for the original Vive. HTC later released bundles of the Vive Pro with base stations and controllers, with the "Starter Kit" including the original controllers and base stations, and the "Full Kit" featuring updated SteamVR 2.0 base stations and controllers, which have improved performance and tracking volume (supporting spaces of up to 10 square metres in size) but are not backwards compatible with the original HTC Vive headset and controllers.

In January 2019 at CES, HTC unveiled the Vive Pro Eye, which has built-in eye tracking. On 11 May 2021, HTC unveiled the Vive Pro 2, which switches to LCD panels and increases its screens to 2448×2448 resolution per-eye (marketed as 5K resolution), with a 120-degree field of view, 120 Hz refresh rate, and Display Stream Compression support. HTC promoted that the displays had "minimal motion blur" and that they had "virtually eliminated" the screen-door effect. It carries backwards compatibility with all existing HTC Vive and SteamVR-compatible accessories and controllers. As with the original Pro, it was initially released as a standalone headset only. The Full Kit version of the Vive Pro 2 began shipping in October 2021.

=== Vive Focus ===
Vive Focus is a line of standalone headsets which do not require a computer to operate. It targets the business market, competing primarily with Meta Quest.

The first-generation Vive Focus used a Qualcomm Snapdragon 835 system-on-chip, with input provided via either a small, remote-like controller, or motion controllers using three degrees of freedom. It was initially released in China, and launched internationally in November 2018. In February 2019, HTC announced the Vive Focus Plus, a hardware refresh with updated motion controllers that support six degrees of freedom, and design tweaks for improved weight distribution.

A direct successor known as the Vive Focus 3 was unveiled in May 2021. It uses the Qualcomm Snapdragon XR2 Gen 1 system-on-chip, has a per-eye resolution of 2448×2448 LCD at 90 Hz, a 120-degree field of view, and improved comfort. It supports Vive Business Streaming for playing VR content from a computer. In September 2024, HTC unveiled the Vive Focus Vision, an updated version of the Focus 3 with an improved strap and cooling system, 12 GB of RAM, 16 megapixel color passthrough cameras, foveated rendering support, and DisplayPort over USB-C (with an update for wired PC tethering at up to 120 Hz scheduled to be released by the end of the year). It is backward compatible with accessories designed for the Focus 3.

=== Vive Cosmos ===
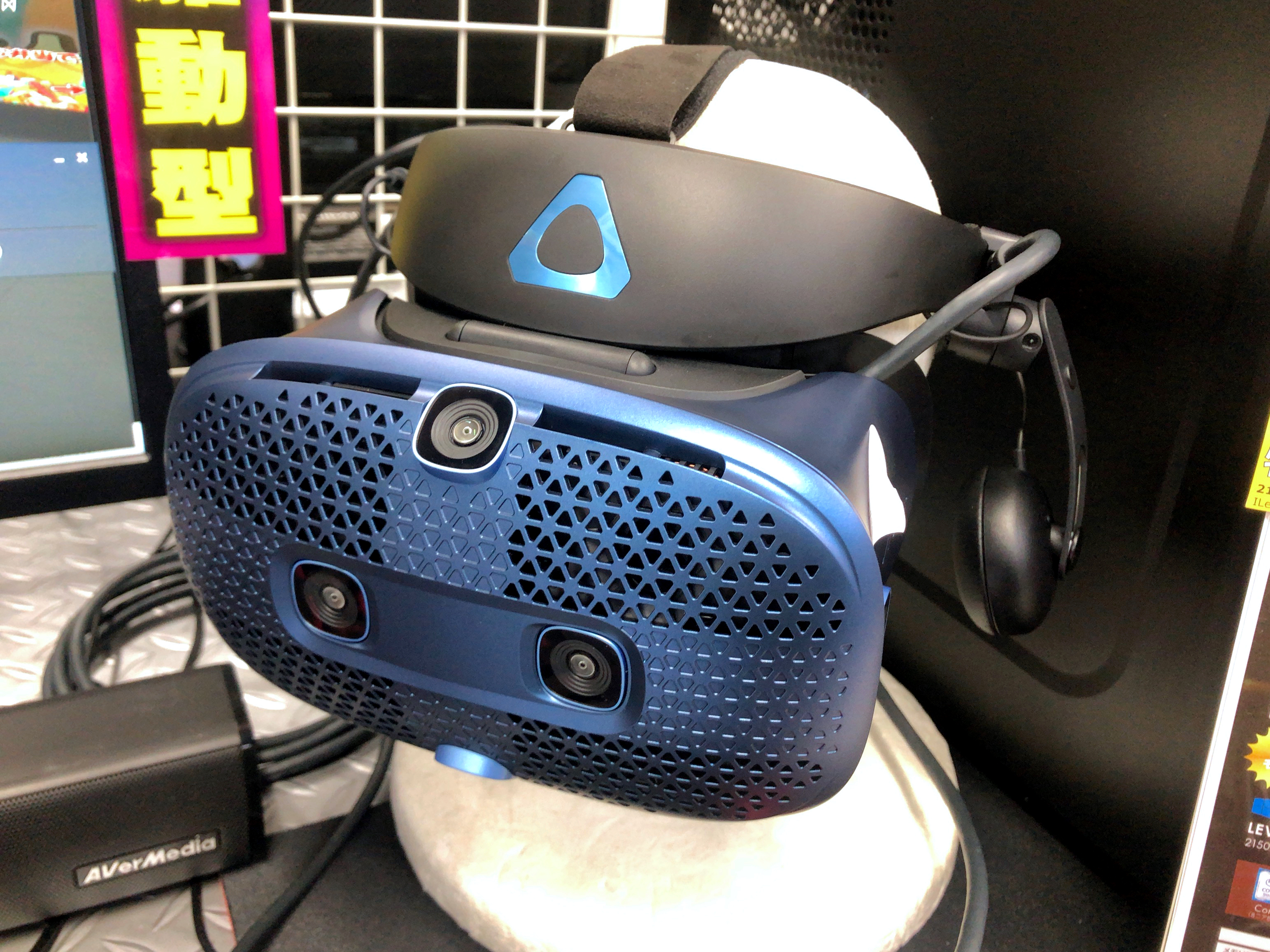
An HTC Vive Cosmos

Also at CES 2019, HTC announced the Vive Cosmos, which began shipping on 3 October 2019.

Similarly to the Oculus Quest and Rift S, it uses "inside-out" tracking, whereby the controllers are tracked using six cameras in the front faceplate of the headset rather than external base stations. Due to its use of inside-out tracking, the Vive Cosmos does not use the wand controllers used by other Vive models, and ships with a different controller that is nearly identical in design and functionality to the second-generation Oculus Touch controllers.

The Cosmos features a 90 Hz liquid-crystal display (LCD) with a 110-degree field of view and overall resolution of 2880×1700. It supports interchangeable faceplates to change its functionality, such as an External Tracking faceplate (which supports tracking with SteamVR base stations). The faceplate can also be lifted up like a visor, allowing the user to see the outside world without fully taking off the headset.

It uses a software platform known as Vive Reality System rather than SteamVR, with the "Lens" user interface and integration with HTC's Viveport platform. In February 2020, HTC announced three new Vive Cosmos SKUs, including the Cosmos Elite (a full kit with the External Tracking faceplate, controllers, and base stations), Cosmos XR (which ships with a faceplate containing "high-quality XR passthrough cameras", designed for enhanced mixed reality experiences), and Cosmos Play (an entry-level model with only four cameras on the faceplate).

=== Vive Flow ===
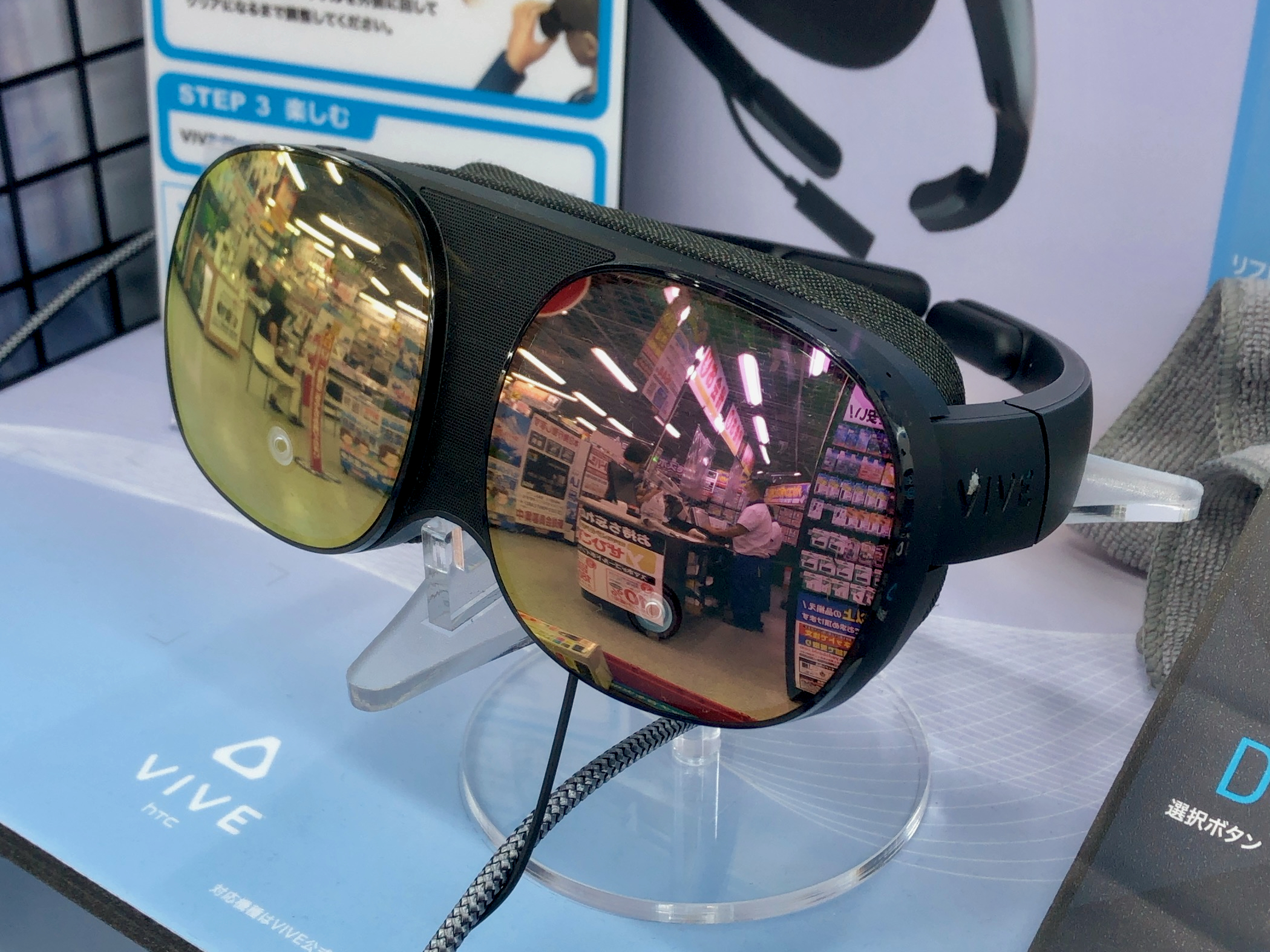
An HTC Vive Flow display unit

In October 2021, HTC unveiled the Vive Flow, a lightweight standalone headset with a visor-like form factor worn like glasses. It has a 75 Hz LCD with a 100-degree field of view, and is powered by the Qualcomm Snapdragon XR1 processor. The Vive Focus is designed to be used with an external power supply (such as a USB power bank), with a limited battery backup. The headset supports inside-out tracking, and uses an Android smartphone as a pointer and touchpad rather than a dedicated controller; the user can also mirror apps from the paired smartphone in the VR environment. The Vive Flow is designed primarily for "stationary" experiences (such as multimedia and 360-degree video) rather than gaming, with a variant of the Viveport subscription service for Vive Flow being focused upon such apps. Its lenses also support dioptre adjustment so that users with eyeglass prescriptions can use the headset without wearing glasses.

=== Vive XR Elite ===
In January 2023 at CES, HTC announced the Vive XR Elite, a goggle-like, standalone mixed reality headset similar in design to the Meta Quest Pro. It has a 90 Hz LCD with a 110-degree field of view, and is powered by the Qualcomm Snapdragon XR2 system-on-chip. The headset features depth sensors and color passthrough for augmented reality software, while its lenses also support dioptre adjustment. It has a removable battery pack on its rear strap, which is hot-swappable; the headset contains a limited battery backup. The headset can be used with a traditional headstrap, or with a glasses frame similar to the Vive Flow (used with an external power supply). Eye tracking and face tracking accessories are also available.

== Hardware and accessories ==
HTC Vive headsets support a number of accessories

- Vive Tracker: A motion tracking device that can be attached to physical accessories or limbs so they can be tracked via the base stations. Vive Trackers feature a connector that can be used to communicate with the accessory it is attached to. On launch, the Vive Tracker was sold as a standalone product, and in bundles with accessories and games designed to integrate with it, such as the Hyper Blaster (a light gun-style controller), and a racquet designed for sports games. As of 2021 there have been 3 separate iterations of the Vive tracker which have fine-tuned and optimised battery life as well as tracking performance.
  - The Vive Ultimate Tracker is a similar peripheral for the Focus 3 and XR Elite, which uses inside-out tracking rather than external base stations.
- Deluxe Audio Strap: In June 2017, HTC released the Deluxe Audio Strap, a replacement head strap for the first-generation Vive headset which includes integrated over-ear speakers (similar in design to the first-generation Oculus Rift), and padding to improve weight distribution and comfort.
- Vive Wireless Adapter: The Vive Wireless Adapter was launched as an accessory in September 2018 for the original Vive and Vive Pro, which allows the headset to be operated wirelessly with a battery pack and transmitter, using V band WiGig technology. In November 2016, HTC had also unveiled a third-party wireless kit for the Vive known as TPCast, which was developed by a startup funded through the Vive X accelerator program.
- Vive Facial Tracker: In March 2021, HTC announced and released the Vive Facial Tracker, an accessory attached to the headset containing infrared-illuminated cameras for facial motion capture. The functionality can be used in applications such as social worlds, and combined with the eye tracking system on supported models.
- The aGlass lenses are alternate eyepieces developed by 7invensun as part of the Vive X program, which add eye tracking support to the headset.

The Vive also supports other SteamVR-compatible controllers and accessories, such as the Index Controllers.

== Adoption ==
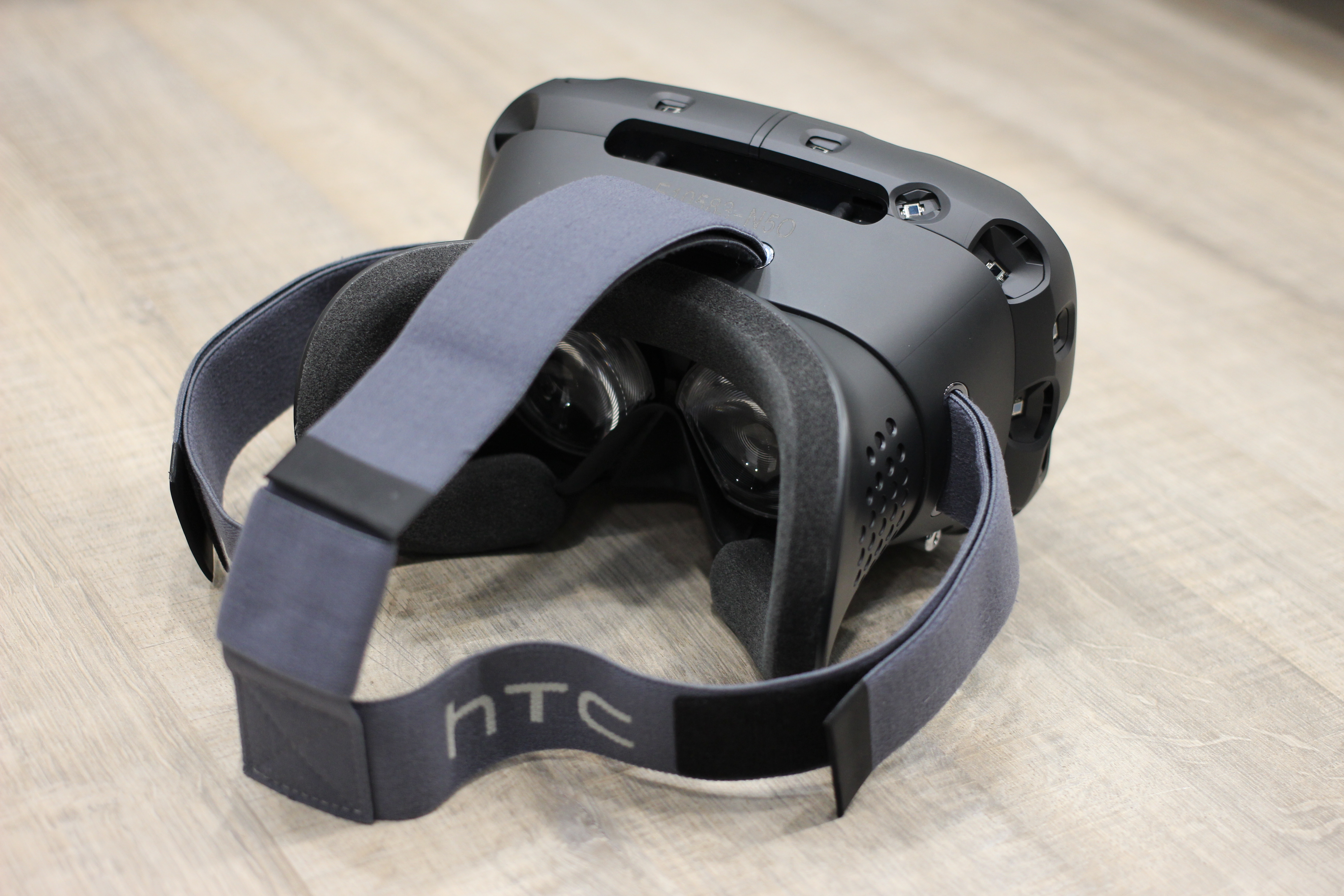
An unmounted HTC Vive development unit

Valve released its OpenVR software development kit (SDK), an updated version of its Steamworks VR API with documentation and examples of how to build software that supports SteamVR hardware. It provides support for the HTC Vive Developer Edition, including the SteamVR controller and Lighthouse.

SteamVR was launched with native support for Unity on its platform.

On 30 April 2015, Epic Games announced support for Valve's SteamVR technology, allowing developers to create VR projects with Unreal Engine 4 for the HTC Vive. Epic said that SteamVR is completely integrated into Unreal Engine 4 across Blueprint visual scripting and native code, meaning projects can be built without being dependent on programmer support if needed. Epic's own Showdown tech demo can already be experienced on SteamVR using the Vive headset.

In July 2016, VR news website Road to VR used game session figures from the Steam VR platform to estimate that approximately 100,000 Vive headsets had been shipped since launch. In the same month, SensoMotoric Instruments (SMI), a computer vision company, integrated its eye tracking technology in the HTC Vive to turn it into a dedicated eye tracking solution for research and professional applications. In November 2016, HTC announced that it would begin the first retail sales of its headsets at JB Hi-Fi and Harvey Norman stores in Australia later that month.

On 23 November 2016, HTC announced that the Vive was sold at a profit and that HTC Vive sales were "much higher" than 140,000 units.

Since the launch of Vive, HTC has increasingly targeted its products towards the business market rather than prosumer and gaming markets, with the Vive Focus 3 in particular having been developed with input from its enterprise customers. Vive General Manager Dan O'Brien stated that "the consumer market has gravitated toward these artificially subsidized price points that really only one company in the world has any tolerance for" (alluding to Facebook Inc.), and that "the enterprise and professional market is a very healthy and rapidly growing market where we can bring real value and solutions." The Vive Focus Vision in 2024 partially backpedaled on this trend, with HTC marketing its changes as appealing to a gaming market.

== See also ==
- Meta Quest
- Valve Index
- Steam Frame
- VirtualLink
- Metaverse
