= Qualcomm VR 820 =

Virtual reality reference platform

The Snapdragon Qualcomm VR820 is a virtual reality reference platform that was released in Q4 2016, with the first commercial devices based on the platform available shortly thereafter. It is based on the Qualcomm Snapdragon 820 processor, released on November 10, 2015.

== Specifications ==
- Qualcomm Adreno 530 GPU.
- Stereoscopic 3D, with foveated rendering, with support for the latest graphics APIs.
- 1440×1440 resolution per eye, AMOLED panel.
- 360°, 4K video playback processing with HEVC compression.
- Qualcomm EcoPix pixel compression.
- Stereo, binaural positional audio, and 3D surround sound with Qualcomm Aqstic.
- Four microphones with Fluence HD and active noise cancellation.
- Dual Qualcomm Spectra camera ISPs and Qualcomm Hexagon DSP, for vision features such as look-through imaging and 3D reconstruction, eye-tracking, and hand gestures.
- Monocular visual motion tracking with 6DOF at 800Hz for head motion tracking in movement and rotation.
- Processing with average motion to photon latency under 18ms.
- 64-bit Qualcomm Kryo quad-core CPU.
- Hexagon 680 DSP for processing advanced vision and audio.
- Qualcomm "All-Ways Aware" sensor technology.

== Sources ==
- "Qualcomm Unveils Snapdragon Virtual Reality Reference Platform for Immersive User Experiences on Standalone Head Mounted Displays | Qualcomm". qualcomm.com.
- "A new era in virtual reality with the Snapdragon VR820 reference platform | Qualcomm". qualcomm.com.
- "Qualcomm Unveils Snapdragon Virtual Reality Reference Platform for Immersive User Experiences on Standalone Head Mounted Displays".prnewswire.com. Retrieved 2024-07-22.
