= Foveated rendering =

Rendering optimization technique

Foveated rendering is a rendering technique which uses an eye tracker integrated with a virtual reality headset to reduce the rendering workload by greatly reducing the image quality in the peripheral vision (outside of the zone gazed by the fovea).

A less sophisticated variant called fixed foveated rendering doesn't utilise eye tracking and instead assumes a fixed focal point.

== History ==
Research into foveated rendering dates back at least to 1991.

At Tech Crunch Disrupt SF 2014, Fove unveiled a headset featuring foveated rendering. This was followed by a successful kickstarter in May 2015.

At CES 2016, SensoMotoric Instruments (SMI) demoed a new 250 Hz eye tracking system and a working foveated rendering solution. It resulted from a partnership with camera sensor manufacturer Omnivision who provided the camera hardware for the new system.

In July 2016, Nvidia demonstrated during SIGGRAPH a new method of foveated rendering claimed to be invisible to users.

In February 2017, Qualcomm announced their Snapdragon 835 Virtual Reality Development Kit (VRDK) which includes foveated rendering support called Adreno Foveation.

== Use ==
According to chief scientist Michael Abrash at Oculus, utilising foveated rendering in conjunction with sparse rendering and deep learning image reconstruction has the potential to require an order of magnitude fewer pixels to be rendered in comparison to a full image. Later, these results have been demonstrated and published.

In December 2019, fixed foveated rendering support was added to the Oculus Quest SDK. A number of VR headsets have included on-board eye tracking to provide support for foveated rendering, including HTC's Vive Pro Eye (2019), Meta Quest Pro (2022), PlayStation VR2 (2023), and Apple Vision Pro (2024).

In 2025, Valve announced the upcoming Steam Frame headset, which applies a variation of the technique known as "foveated streaming" for wireless streaming from a PC to the headset; the method similarly uses variance in bit rate, and is performed at the encoder level rather than the software level.

== See also ==
- Foveated imaging
- Fovea
- Gaze-contingency paradigm
- Digital image processing
