= SensoMotoric Instruments =

Former German eye-tracking software company

SensoMotoric Instruments GmbH
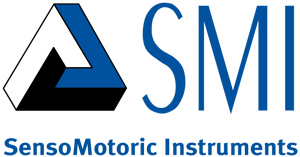
- Type: Privately owned
- Industry: Hardware and software development
- Founded: 1991
- Headquarters: Teltow, Germany
- Key people: Ali Sahin (Managing Director)
- Products: Eye tracking technology

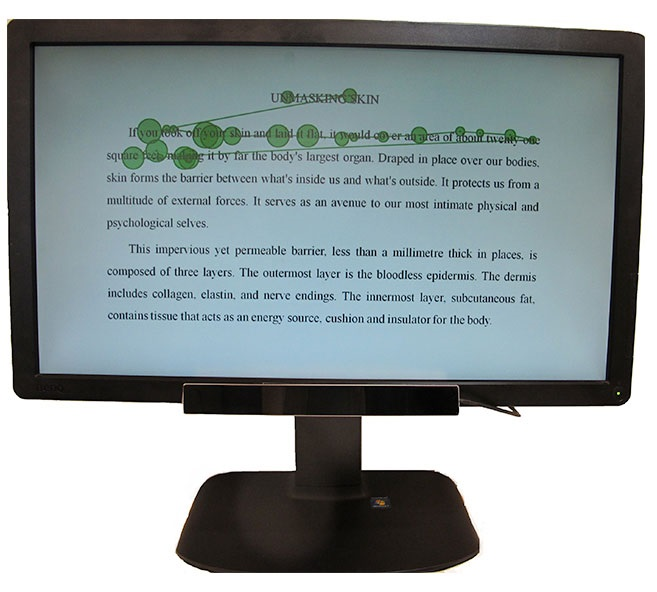
RED250mobile eye tracker, released in 2014; screen showing a scan path on a text. Photo by SMI.

SensoMotoric Instruments (SMI) was a German provider of dedicated computer vision applications focusing on eye-tracking technology. SMI was founded in 1991 as a spin-off from academic and medical research at the Free University of Berlin. The company has its headquarters in Teltow near Berlin, Germany, with additional offices in Boston, Massachusetts, and San Francisco, California, in the United States, and a worldwide distributor and partner network.

SMI provided eye tracking systems for scientific research, professional services, and OEM applications. These eye trackers could be combined with motion tracking systems, EEG, and other biometric data. They can be integrated into virtual reality CAVEs, head-mounted displays – such as Google Glass or Oculus Rift, simulators, cars, or computers as a measurement or interaction modality.

== History ==
The company was founded by Dr. Winfried Teiwes in 1991. SMI's first system, 3D VOG, was employed by the ESA, the NASA, and on board the Russian space station Mir to analyze the effect of space missions on the gravity-responsive torsional eye movements of astronauts. Gradually, the company shifted its focus from astronautics towards ophthalmology and scientific research. Dr. Teiwes remained the company's Managing Director until 2008, when Eberhard Schmidt took over. After the sale of the ENT product line to Interacoustics – the diagnostics arm of William Demant Group – in 2001, the spin-out of the retinal treatment activities into OD-OS in 2008, and the sale of the Ophthalmic division to Alcon in 2012, the company focused on scientific and professional eye tracking research services, virtual reality applications, and OEM integrations.

== Technology and Products ==
The technology is based on dark pupil and corneal reflection tracking: The cameras in the SMI eye trackers detect the face, eyes, and pupils, as well as corneal reflections from infrared light sources, and calculate eye movements, gaze direction, and points of regard. The sampling frequency of these eye trackers ranges from 30 Hz to several kHz.

On the hardware side, the company has three main product lines: mobile Eye Tracking Glasses (ETG), remote eye-tracking systems (RED), and tower-mounted systems (Hi-Speed).

The experimental design and data analysis software is called Experiment Suite, which comes in different packages depending on the user's research interests.

== Partnerships ==
At the 2014 Game Developers Conference, Sony unveiled the prototype InFamous: Second Son game for PlayStation 4, using SMI's RED-oem eye tracking system.

At CES 2016, SMI demoed a new 250 Hz eye tracking system and a working foveated rendering product that resulted from a partnership with camera sensor manufacturer, Omnivision, who provided the camera hardware for the new system.

In 2015, DEWESoft, with SMI, integrated the Eye Tracking Glasses into a driver machine monitoring and analysis platform for advanced driver-assistance systems (ADAS).

In 2014, Red Bull started using the Eye Tracking Glasses as part of their Red Bull Surf Science project. At the Game Developers Conference 2014, Sony unveiled the prototype of the PlayStation 4 game Infamous: Second Son with the RED-oem eye tracking system integrated into it.

In 2013, TechViz integrated SMI's 3D Eye Tracking Glasses with their 3D visualization software, enabling eye tracking in a virtual reality CAVE. The 3D Eye Tracking Glasses were developed in partnership with Volfoni. In the same year, WorldViz started cooperating with SMI to enable the calculation of intersections of gaze vectors with 3D objects and saving the data in one common database for deeper analysis. German Research Center for Artificial Intelligence (DFKI) used the Eye Tracking Glasses to create Talking Places – the prototype of an interactive city guide.

In 2012, in partnership with Emotiv, SMI developed a software package that combined the EEG data from the Emotiv EEG Neuroheadset with eye-tracking data. Neuromarketers can use this software to analyze consumer reactions to brands according to visual and emotional cues. Prentke Romich Company integrated SMI's NuEye eye-gaze accessory into its speech-generating platform for people with disabilities. The system allows users to control a communication device using only their eyes. Additionally, Visual Interaction offers the myGaze eye tracking accessory based on SMI technology with selected software packages for assistive applications.

== Acquisition ==
In June 2017, it was reported that Apple acquired SMI.

== Awards ==
In 1992, SMI won the Berlin and Brandenburg Innovation Prize.

In 2009, SMI's iView X RED system received the iF Product Design Award.

== See also ==
- Biopac
- Emotiv
- Eye tracking
- Video-oculography
- Visual perception
