= Video-oculography =

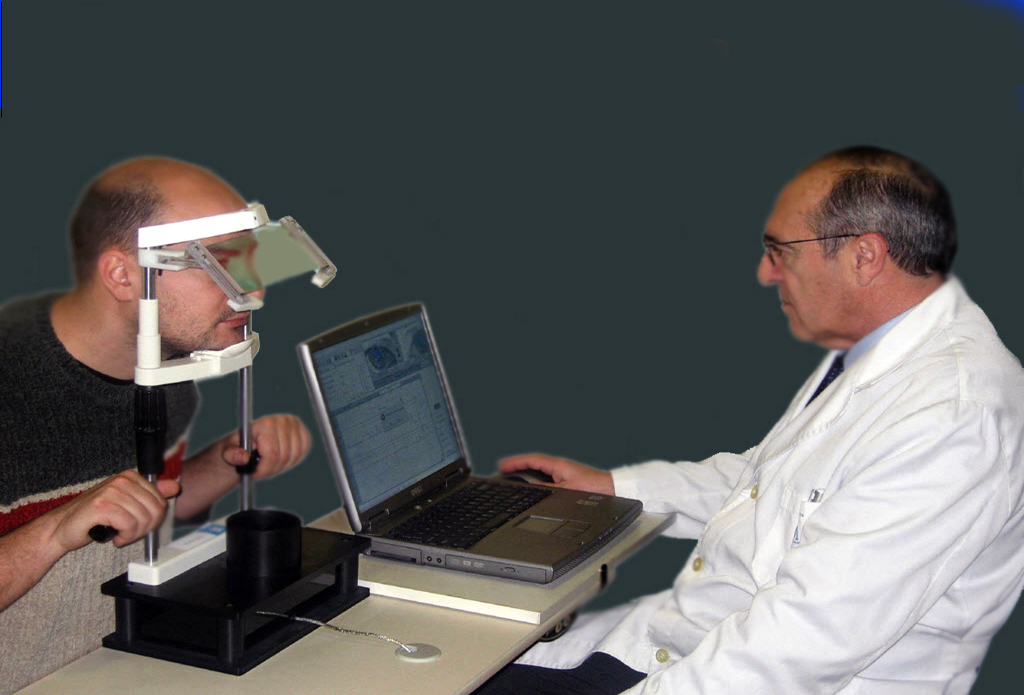
Video-oculography examination in progress

Video-oculography (VOG) is a non-invasive, video-based method of measuring horizontal, vertical and torsional position components of the movements of both eyes (eye tracking) using a head-mounted mask that is equipped with small cameras. VOG is usually employed for medical purposes.

== Technology ==
The measurement of the horizontal and vertical components is well established technology which uses pupil tracking and/or corneal reflection tracking and has been widely applied, for example for tracking eye movements in reading. In contrast, the measurement of the torsional component (cyclorotation) is usually considered a computationally more difficult task. Approaches to solving this problem include, among others, polar cross correlation methods and iris pattern matching/tracking.

In animal studies, VOG has been used in combination with fluorescent marker arrays affixed to the eye, and it has been proposed that such an array could be embedded into a scleral lens for humans.

== Use ==
VOG techniques have been put to use in a wide field of scientific research related to visual development and cognitive science as well as to pathologies of the eyes and of the visual system.

For example, miniaturized ocular-videography systems are used to analyze eye movements in freely moving rodents.

VOG can be used in eye examinations for quantitative assessments of ocular motility, binocular vision, vergence, cyclovergence, stereoscopy and disorders related to eye positioning such as nystagmus and strabismus.

It has also been proposed for assessing linear and torsional eye movements in vestibular patients and for early stroke recognition.
