= Fove =

Japanese virtual reality company

FOVE Inc.
- Type: Private
- Industry: Virtual reality, Eye tracking
- Founded: May 2014; 12 years ago
- Founders: Yuka Kojima, Lochlainn Wilson
- Headquarters: Tokyo, Japan
- Key people: Shintaro Karaki (CEO)
- Products: FOVE 0, FOVE VR Platform
- Website: fove-inc.com

FOVE Inc. is a Japanese technology company that develops virtual reality (VR) headsets equipped with eye-tracking capabilities. By integrating eye-tracking technology into VR, FOVE enables more immersive experiences and applications across various fields, including healthcare, education, and research. The company's hardware and software solutions are utilized by medical institutions and academic organizations both in Japan and internationally.

== History ==
FOVE Inc. was founded in May 2014 by Yuka Kojima and Lochlainn Wilson in Tokyo, Japan. The company began developing a VR headset with integrated eye-tracking technology. In May 2015, FOVE's headset was recognized by Guinness World Records as the world's first eye-tracking virtual reality headset.

In November 2016, FOVE began shipping its first product, the "FOVE 0", targeting developers and researchers.

== Products ==
=== FOVE 0 ===
The FOVE 0 is the company's first commercial VR headset, released in November 2016. It was the first VR device to incorporate real-time eye-tracking technology, allowing for gaze-based interaction and analytics. The headset features a 2560×1440 resolution display, a field of view of approximately 100 degrees, and support for six degrees of freedom (6DoF) head tracking.

=== FOVE VR Platform ===
The FOVE VR Platform is a software environment required to run VR applications on the FOVE 0 headset. It supports both free and paid plans, which differ in the level of access to eye movement data and analytics. The platform enables developers to obtain detailed eye-tracking data including gaze coordinates, blink events, and pupil diameter.

== Applications ==
=== Healthcare ===
FOVE's systems are used for early screening of mild cognitive impairment (MCI), concussion assessment, visual rehabilitation, and evaluation of neurological and ophthalmological conditions. Several hospitals and clinics in Japan have adopted FOVE systems.

=== Research ===
Academic institutions use FOVE in psychology, neuroscience, and HCI research to analyze gaze patterns and cognitive processes.

== Installations and collaborations ==
FOVE has been deployed at:

- Kyushu University Hospital – cognitive function research
- Saga University – gaze-based cognitive screening research
- University of Tokyo – interdisciplinary VR studies
- Kanazawa University – attention and visual behavior analysis

FOVE has also partnered with pharmaceutical companies and clinics to provide screening tools for health checkups and community healthcare.
