= Inference attack =

Data mining technique

An inference attack is a data mining technique performed by analyzing data in order to illegitimately gain knowledge about a subject or database. A subject's sensitive information can be considered as leaked if an adversary can infer its real value with high confidence. This is an example of breached information security. An inference attack occurs when a user is able to infer from trivial information more robust information about a database without directly accessing it. The object of Inference attacks is to piece together information at one security level to determine a fact that should be protected at a higher security level.

While inference attacks were originally discovered as a threat in statistical databases, today they also pose a major privacy threat in the domain of mobile and IoT sensor data. Data from accelerometers, which can be accessed by third-party apps without user permission in many mobile devices, has been used to infer rich information about users based on the recorded motion patterns (e.g., driving behavior, level of intoxication, age, gender, touchscreen inputs, geographic location). Highly sensitive inferences can also be derived, for example, from eye tracking data, smart meter data and voice recordings (e.g., smart speaker voice commands).
