= Eye movement in reading =

Eye movement in reading involves the visual processing of written text. This was described by the French ophthalmologist Louis Émile Javal in the late 19th century. He reported that the eyes do not move continuously along a line of text, but make short, rapid movements (saccades) intermingled with short stops (fixations). Javal's observations were characterised by a reliance on naked-eye observation of eye movement in the absence of technology. From the late 19th to the mid-20th century, investigators used early tracking technologies to assist their observation, in a research climate that emphasised the measurement of human behaviour and skill for educational ends. Most basic knowledge about eye movement was obtained during this period. Since the mid-20th century, there have been three major changes: the development of non-invasive eye-movement tracking equipment; the introduction of computer technology to enhance the power of this equipment to pick up, record, and process the huge volume of data that eye movement generates; and the emergence of cognitive psychology as a theoretical and methodological framework within which reading processes are examined. Sereno & Rayner (2003) believed that the best current approach to discover immediate signs of word recognition is through recordings of eye movement and event-related potential.

== History ==
Until the second half of the 19th century, researchers had at their disposal three methods of investigating eye movement. The first, unaided observation, yielded only small amounts of data that would be considered unreliable by today's scientific standards. This lack of reliability arises from the fact that eye movement occurs frequently, rapidly, and over small angles, to the extent that it is impossible for an experimenter to perceive and record the data fully and accurately without technological assistance. The other method was self-observation, now considered to be of doubtful status in a scientific context. Despite this, some knowledge appears to have been produced from introspection and naked-eye observation. For example, the 11th century scientist Ibn al Haytham is reported to have written of reading and to have realised that readers use peripheral as well as central vision.

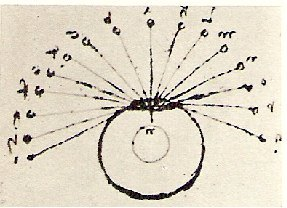
Leonardo da Vinci: The eye has a central line and everything that reaches the eye through this central line can be seen distinctly.

Leonardo da Vinci (1452–1519) may have been the first in Europe to recognize certain special optical qualities of the eye. He derived his insights partly through introspection but mainly through a process that could be described as optical modelling. Based on dissection of the human eye he made experiments with water-filled crystal balls. He wrote "The function of the human eye, ... was described by a large number of authors in a certain way. But I found it to be completely different."

His main experimental finding was that there is only distinct and clear vision at the "line of sight", the visual axis that ends at the fovea. Although he did not use these words literally he actually is the father of the modern distinction between foveal vision (where the observer fixates on the object of interest) and peripheral vision (where the observer fixates somewhere else). However, Leonardo did not know that the retina is the sensible layer, he still believed that the lens is the organ of vision.

There appear to be no records of eye movement research until the early 19th century. At first, the chief concern was to describe the eye as a physiological and mechanical moving object, the most serious attempt being Hermann von Helmholtz's major work Handbook of physiological optics (1866). The physiological approach was gradually superseded by interest in the psychological aspects of visual input, in eye movement as a functional component of visual tasks.

The subsequent decades saw more elaborate attempts to interpret eye movement, including a claim that meaningful text requires fewer fixations to read than random strings of letters. In 1879, the French ophthalmologist Louis Émile Javal used a mirror on one side of a page to observe eye movement in silent reading, and found that it involves a succession of discontinuous individual movements for which he coined the term saccades. In 1898, Erdmann & Dodge used a hand-mirror to estimate average fixation duration and saccade length with surprising accuracy.

=== Early tracking technology ===
An eye-tracking device is a tool created to help measure eye and head movements. The first devices for tracking eye movement took two main forms: those that relied on a mechanical connection between participant and recording instrument, and those in which light or some other form of electromagnetic energy was directed at the participant's eyes and its reflection measured and recorded. In 1883, Lamare was the first to use a mechanical connection, by placing a blunt needle on the participant's upper eyelid. The needle picked up the sound produced by each saccade and transmitted it as a faint clicking to the experimenter's ear through an amplifying membrane and a rubber tube. The rationale behind this device was that saccades are easier to perceive and register aurally than visually. In 1889, Edmund B. Delabarre invented a system of recording eye movement directly onto a rotating drum by means of a stylus with a direct mechanical connection to the cornea. Other devices involving physical contact with the surface of the eyes were developed and used from the end of the 19th century until the late 1920s; these included such items as rubber balloons and eye caps.

Mechanical systems suffered three serious disadvantages: questionable accuracy due to slippage of the physical connection, the considerable discomfort caused to participants by the direct mechanical connection (and consequently great difficulty in persuading people to participate), and issues of ecological validity, since participants' experience of reading in trials was significantly different from the normal reading experience. Despite these drawbacks, mechanical devices were used in eye movement research well into the 20th century.

Attempts were soon made to overcome these problems. One solution was to use electromagnetic energy rather than a mechanical connection. In the "Dodge technique", a beam of light was directed at the cornea, focused by a system of lenses and then recorded on a moveable photographic plate. Erdmann & Dodge used this technique to claim that there is little or no perception during saccades, a finding that was later confirmed by Utall & Smith using more sophisticated equipment. The photographic plate in the Dodge technique was soon replaced with a film camera, but was still plagued by problems of accuracy, due to the difficulty of keeping all parts of the equipment perfectly aligned throughout a trial and accurately compensating for the distortion caused by the diffractive qualities of photographic lenses. In addition, it was usually necessary to restrain a participant's head by using an uncomfortable bite-bar or head-clamp.

In 1922, Schott pioneered a further advance called electro-oculography (EOG), a method of recording the electrical potential between the cornea and the retina. Electrodes may be covered with special contact paste before being placed on the skin. So, it is now unnecessary to make incisions in patient's skin. A common misconception about EOG is that the measured potential is the electromyogram of extraocular muscles. In fact, it is only the projection of eye dipole to the skin, because higher frequencies, corresponding to EMG, are filtered out. EOG delivered considerable improvements in accuracy and reliability, which explain its continued use by experimentalists for many decades.

== Modern eye tracking ==
Four major cognitive systems are involved in eye movement during reading: language processing, attention, vision, and oculomotor control. Eye trackers bounce near infrared light off the interior of the eyeball, and monitor the reflection on the eye to determine gaze location. With this technique, the position of a fixation on a screen can be precisely determined. Wang (2011) mentioned that a video-based eye-tracker which uses video cameras to record the eye position of human subjects—recording pupil dilation and eye movement—can be used to examine how fixations, saccades, and pupil dilation responses are related to the information on the screen and behavioral choices. According to Wang,

understanding the relationship between these observables can help us to understand how human behavior in the economy can be affected by what information people acquire, where their attention is focused, what emotional state they are in, and even what brain activity they are engaged in. This is because fixations and saccades (matched with information shown on screen) indicate how people acquire information (and what they see), time lengths of fixations indicate attention, and pupil dilation responses indicate emotion, arousal, stress, pain, or cognitive load.

== Saccades ==
Horizontal eye movement in reading. Left-to-right movement may be seen as "upstairs", and right-to-left saccades are clear.

Skilled readers move their eyes during reading on the average of every quarter of a second. During the time that the eye is fixated, new information is brought into the processing system. Although the average fixation duration is 200–250 ms (thousandths of a second), the range is from 100 ms to over 500 ms. The distance the eye moves in each saccade (or short rapid movement) is between 1 and 20 characters with the average being 7–9 characters. The saccade lasts for 20–40 ms and during this time vision is suppressed so that no new information is acquired. There is considerable variability in fixations (the point at which a saccade jumps to) and saccades between readers and even for the same person reading a single passage of text. Skilled readers make regressions back to material already read about 15 percent of the time. The main difference between faster and slower readers is that the latter group consistently shows longer average fixation durations, shorter saccades, and more regressions. These basic facts about eye movement have been known for almost a hundred years, but only recently have researchers begun to look at eye movement behavior as a reflection of cognitive processing during reading.

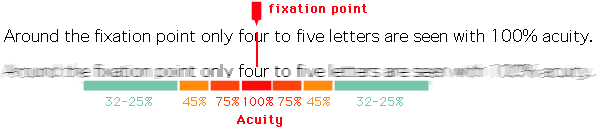
A diagram demonstrating the acuity of foveal vision in reading

The lower line of text simulates the acuity of vision with the relative acuity percentages. The difficulty of recognizing text increases with the distance from the fixation point.

== Dyslexia ==
People with dyslexia generally have a decreased reading speed, which can be caused by many different variables. There are many remedies to try to combat these deficits, depending on what biological theory of dyslexia they are based on. One such idea is based on magnocellular deficit, where magnocellular pathways are uncoordinated, causing the skipping or re-reading of lines.

=== Computer models of eye movement in reading ===
Competition–interaction theory and SERIF emphasise low level oculomotor processes in reading such as how the word length of the currently fixated word and its neighbour words affect saccade amplitude and latency (or fixation duration). Reader, EMMA, E-Z Reader and SWIFT emphasise higher level cognitive processes such as lexical processing, word frequency, word parsing or word predictability.

== See also ==
- Biological theories of dyslexia
- Eye movement
- Eye movement in music reading
- Gaze-contingency paradigm
- Reading
- Fixation (visual)
- Eye tracking
- Eye tracking on the International Space Station
- Foveal
- Screen reading
