= Gaze-contingency paradigm =

Techniques for changing computer screen display depending on where the viewer is looking

Within computer technology, the gaze-contingency paradigm is a general term for techniques allowing a computer screen display to change in function depending on where the viewer is looking. Gaze-contingent techniques are part of the eye movement field of study in psychology.

From a system analysis point of view, eye-tracking applications should be distinguished from diagnostic or interactive system. In diagnostic mode, the eye tracker provides data about the observer's visual search and attention processes. In interactive mode, the eye-tracker is used as an input device. From a general point of view, an interactive system responds to the observer's actions and interacts with them. Because the display updates in response to the observer's eye movements, the gaze-contingency paradigm can be classified an interactive eye-tracking application.

== Background ==
Over the past century, the way the eyes move in human activities as diverse as playing sport, viewing works of art, piloting aircraft, exploring visual scenes, recognizing face or facial expressions, reading language, and sight-reading of music, has revealed some of the ocular and psychological mechanisms involved in the visual system. The gaze-contingent techniques aim to overcome limitations inherent to simple eye-movement recording. Indeed, due to an imperfect coupling between overt and covert attention, it is not possible to exactly know which visual information the viewer is processing based on the fixation locations. By controlling precisely the information projected in different parts of the visual field, the gaze-contingent techniques permit to disentangle what is fixated and what is processed.

The technical principle of the paradigm involves a computer interfaced with both an eye-movement tracking system (eye-tracker) and a display of the visual stimulus. Successful gaze-contingency requires a fast computer, a display with a high refresh rate, and an eye tracker with low latency. In gaze-contingent displays, the stimulus is continuously updated as a function of the observers' current gaze position; for instance, in the moving window paradigm, observers can see the scene only through a central hole, giving the sensation of seeing through a telescope.

Therefore, the gaze-contingent technique is a powerful method to control for the visual information feeding the visual system and to isolate information use.

== Techniques ==
The gaze-contingent technique is the basis of various experimental paradigms, each of them allowing to investigate specific cognitive processes. In the moving window paradigm only the part of the visual field around the gaze location (foveal information) is displayed normally, the surrounding part of the visual field (extrafoveal and peripheral information) being altered (removed for visual scenes or replaced by chains of X in reading). The moving mask paradigm is a reverse technique in comparison with the moving window paradigm. It dynamically obscures central vision (or replaces letters with X in reading), permitting only extrafoveal information use. In the boundary paradigm, an extrafoveal prime (a homophone in reading for example) is replaced by the target stimulus when the eyes cross an invisible boundary around the target area. In a related technique, the display can be updated when the gaze moves at a speed higher than a specified velocity threshold, ensuring that the display updates during a saccade. This velocity thresholding technique is used to prevent the observer from noticing the changes made to the display, because saccadic suppression blocks visual processing during saccades. The parafoveal magnification paradigm compensates for how visual acuity drops off as a function of retinal eccentricity. On each fixation and in real time, parafoveal text is magnified to equalize its perceptual impact with that of concurrent foveal text.

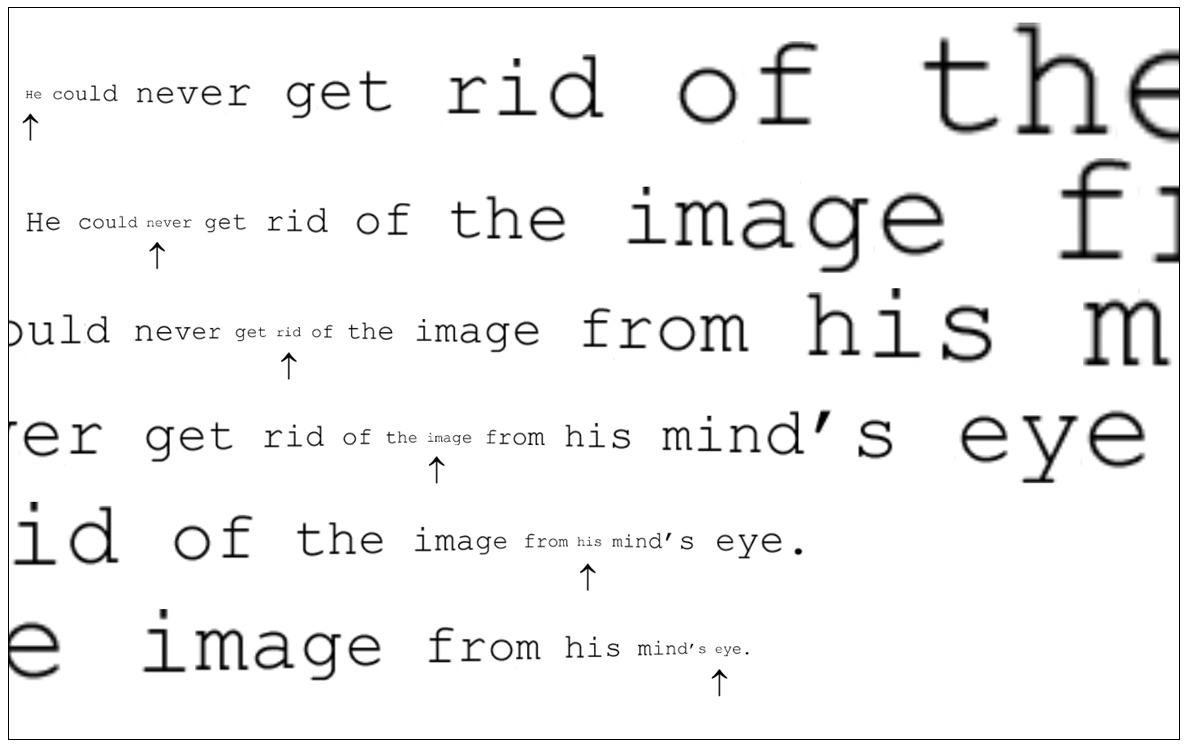
Parafoveal magnification paradigm: Graphical depiction of the parafoveal magnification paradigm (Miellet et al., 2009). The location of each fixation is indicated with an arrow and the corresponding display for that fixation is represented. Consecutive lines represent the chronological order of fixations.

In the language domain, this method has been successfully used in natural reading. The study of eye movements in reading allowed researchers to map out the perceptual span (moving window paradigm), the nature of the extrafoveal information extracted during a fixation, for instance orthographic and phonological information (boundary paradigm) or the relative influence of attention versus visual acuity drop-off in the perceptual span (parafoveal magnification paradigm).

Gaze-contingent techniques can also be used to ensure compliance with other aspects of a task. For example, some researchers have required that observers look at a specific location and press a button before the task begins, and others have made the entire task display disappear whenever the observers look away from a specific task-relevant area.

== Applications ==
The gaze-contingent technique has been adapted in other tasks than reading. The moving window paradigm has been used to study the effect of culture in face recognition for example. The moving mask paradigm has been used in visual learning or visual search of animals in natural visual scenes.

The various gaze-contingent techniques has given eye-movement researchers the ability to observe the processing of visual input in much greater detail (particularly its temporal characteristics), the perceptual span, and the nature of central versus peripheral processing in reading.

== See also ==
- Eye movement
- Eye tracking
- Eye movement in language reading
- Eye movement in music reading
- Foveated imaging
- Attention
