= Biopac student lab =

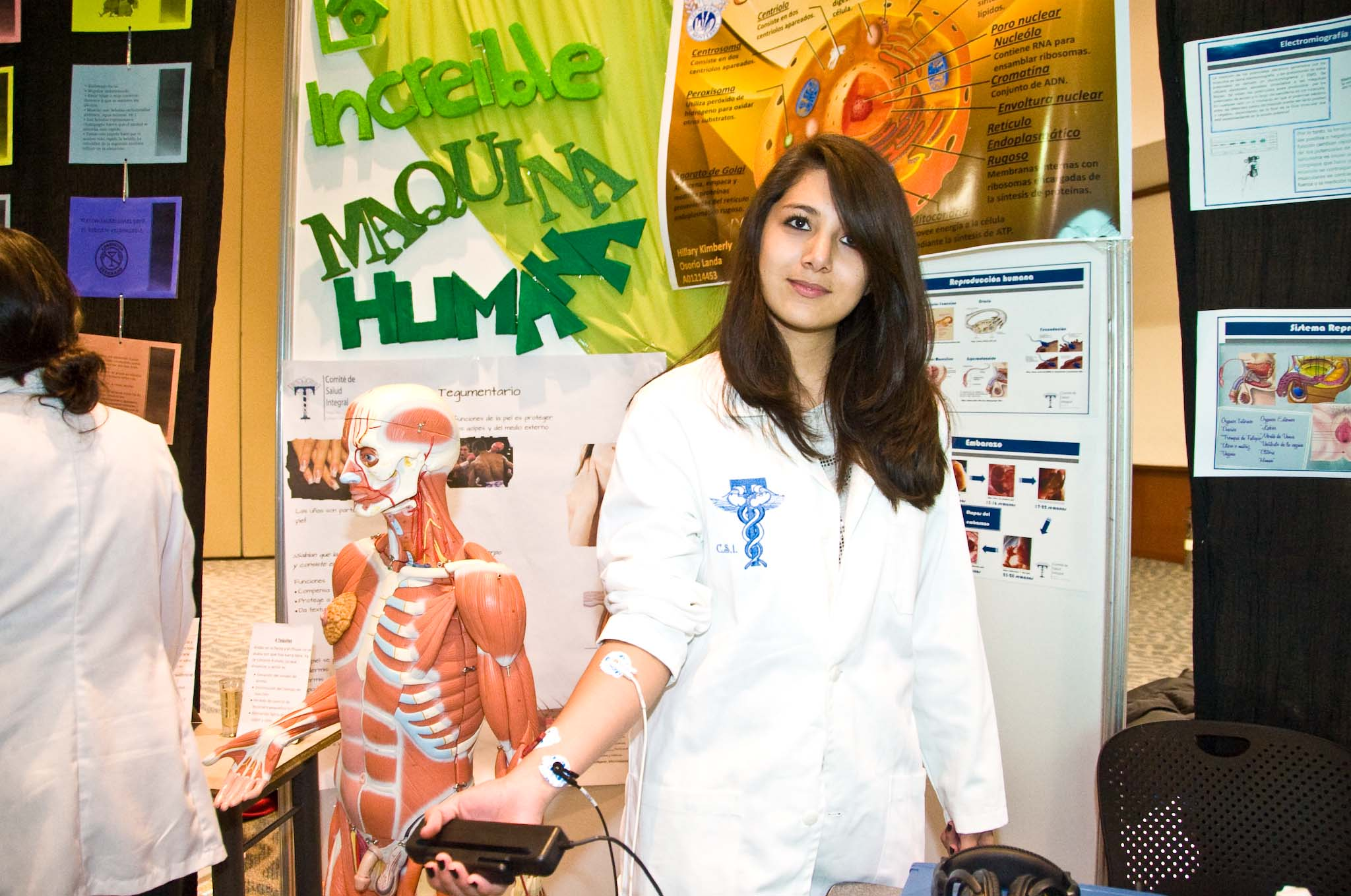
Student using a Biopac at Monterrey Institute of Technology and Higher Education, Mexico City.

The Biopac Student Lab is a proprietary teaching device and method introduced in 1995 as a digital replacement for aging chart recorders and oscilloscopes that were widely used in undergraduate teaching laboratories prior to that time. It is manufactured by BIOPAC Systems, Inc., of Goleta, California. The advent of low cost personal computers meant that older analog technologies could be replaced with powerful and less expensive computerized alternatives.

Students in undergraduate teaching labs use the BSL system to record data from their own bodies, animals or tissue preparations. The BSL system integrates hardware, software and curriculum materials including over sixty experiments that students use to study the cardiovascular system, muscles, pulmonary function, autonomic nervous system, and the brain.

== History of physiology and electricity ==
One of the more complicated concepts for students to grasp is the fact that electricity is flowing throughout a living body at all times and that it is possible to use the signals to measure the performance and health of individual parts of the body. The Biopac Student Lab System helps to explain the concept and allows students to understand physiology.

Physiology and electricity share a common history, with some of the pioneering work in each field being done in the late 18th century by Count Alessandro Giuseppe Antonio Anastasio Volta and Luigi Galvani. Count Volta invented the battery and had a unit of electrical measurement named in his honor (the Volt). These early researchers studied "animal electricity" and were among the first to realize that applying an electrical signal to an isolated animal muscle caused it to twitch. The Biopac Student Lab uses procedures similar to Count Volta’s to demonstrate how muscles can be electrically stimulated.

== Concept ==
The BSL system includes data acquisition hardware with built-in universal amplifiers to record and condition electrical signals from the heart, muscle, nerve, brain, eye, respiratory system, and tissue preparations. The data acquisition system receives the signals from electrodes and transducers. The electrical signals are extremely small—with amplitudes sometimes in the microVolt (1/1,000,000 of a volt) range—so the hardware amplifies these signals, filters out unwanted electrical noise or interfering signals, and converts them to a set of numbers that the computer can read. Biopac Student Lab software then displays the numbers as waveforms on the monitor.

The data acquisition system connects to a PC running Windows or Macintosh operating systems, via USB. The electrodes and transducers employ sensors that allow the software to communicate with the students to ensure that they are using the correct devices and collecting good data. Software guides students by using onscreen instructions and a detailed lab manual follows the scientific method. Once students have collected data, they use analysis tools to measure the amplitude and frequency, plus a wide range of other values from the electrical signals. The analysis process allows students to make general comparisons with the data. They can compare their results to published normal values, or the values before and after a subject performed a specified task. They can also compare results with other students in the lab. The software is available in English, French, Spanish, Italian, Japanese and Chinese.

The Biopac Student Lab System is widely used by undergraduate labs to teach physiology, pharmacology, biology, neuroscience, psychology, psychophysiology, exercise physiology, and biomedical engineering. Publishers have adopted the curriculum materials and included them in commercially available lab manuals.

== Lab manuals that include the Biopac Student Lab ==
- Human Anatomy & Physiology Laboratory Manual, Main Version, Update, 8/E
  - Elaine N. Marieb, Holyoke Community College
  - Susan J. Mitchell, Onondaga Community College
  - Publisher: Pearson Benjamin Cummings
- Laboratory Manual for Anatomy & Physiology, Third Edition
  - Author: Michael G. Wood, M.S., Del Mar College, Corpus Christi, Texas
  - Publisher: PEARSON Benjamin Cummings
- Laboratory Guide to Human Physiology Version: 12
  - Author: Stuart I. Fox, Los Angeles Pierce College
  - Publisher: WCB/McGraw-Hill
- Laboratory Investigations in Anatomy and Physiology Version: Main
  - Stephen N. Sarikas, Lasell College (Newton, MA)
  - Publisher: PEARSON Higher Education
- Manuel de travaux pratiques physiologie humaine Version: 6
  - Michel Dauzat, Collectif Broché
  - Publisher: SAURAMPS
- Psychophysiology/Cognitive Neuroscience
  - Editors: Chad Stephens, Ben Allen, Naeem Thompson
  - Publisher: Kendall Hunt Publishing
