= Eye tracking on the International Space Station =

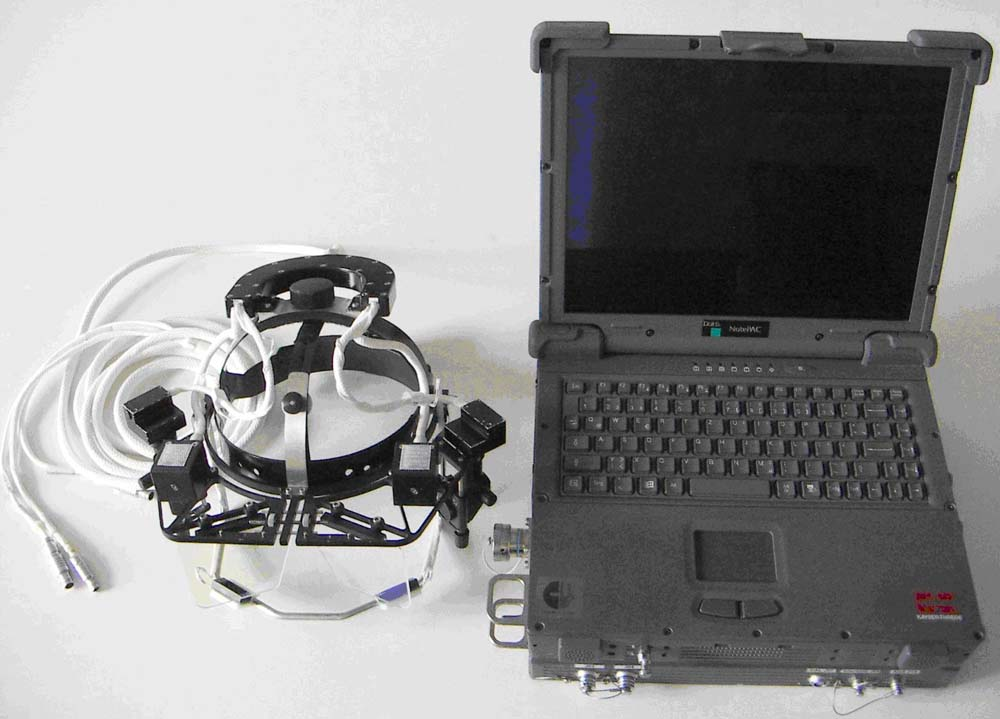
Eye-tracking device (ETD)

An eye-tracking device (ETD) is a headmounted device, designed for measurement of 3D eye and head movements under experimental and natural conditions. The tracker permits comprehensive measurement of eye movement (three degrees of freedom) and optionally head movement (six degrees of freedom). It represents a tool for the investigation of sensorimotor behaviour, particularly of the vestibular and oculomotor systems in both health and disease.

== Eye-tracking device on ISS ==
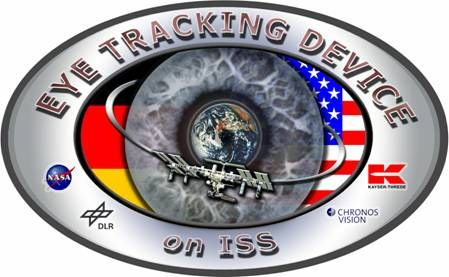
Eye-tracking device on ISS

It was originally developed by the German Space Agency (DLR) for use on the International Space Station (ISS) and was uploaded to the station as part of the joint European / Russian space programme in early 2004. The device was designed by Prof. Dr. Andrew H. Clarke (Vestibular Lab, Charité Berlin) together with the companies Chronos Vision and Mtronix in Berlin and integrated for space utilisation by the Munich-based company Kayser-Threde.

In the first set of experiments, conducted by Prof. Clarke’s team in cooperation with the Moscow Institute for Biomedical Problems, the eye-tracking device was used for the measurement of Listing's plane – a coordinate framework, which is used to define the movement of the eyes in the head. The scientific goal was to determine how Listing’s plane is altered under various gravity conditions. In particular the influence of long-duration microgravity on board the ISS and of the subsequent return to Earth’s gravity was examined. The findings contribute to our understanding of neural plasticity in the vestibular and oculomotor systems.

These experiments started in 2004 and continued until late 2008 with a series of cosmonauts and astronauts, who each spent six months on board the ISS.

=== Operations ===
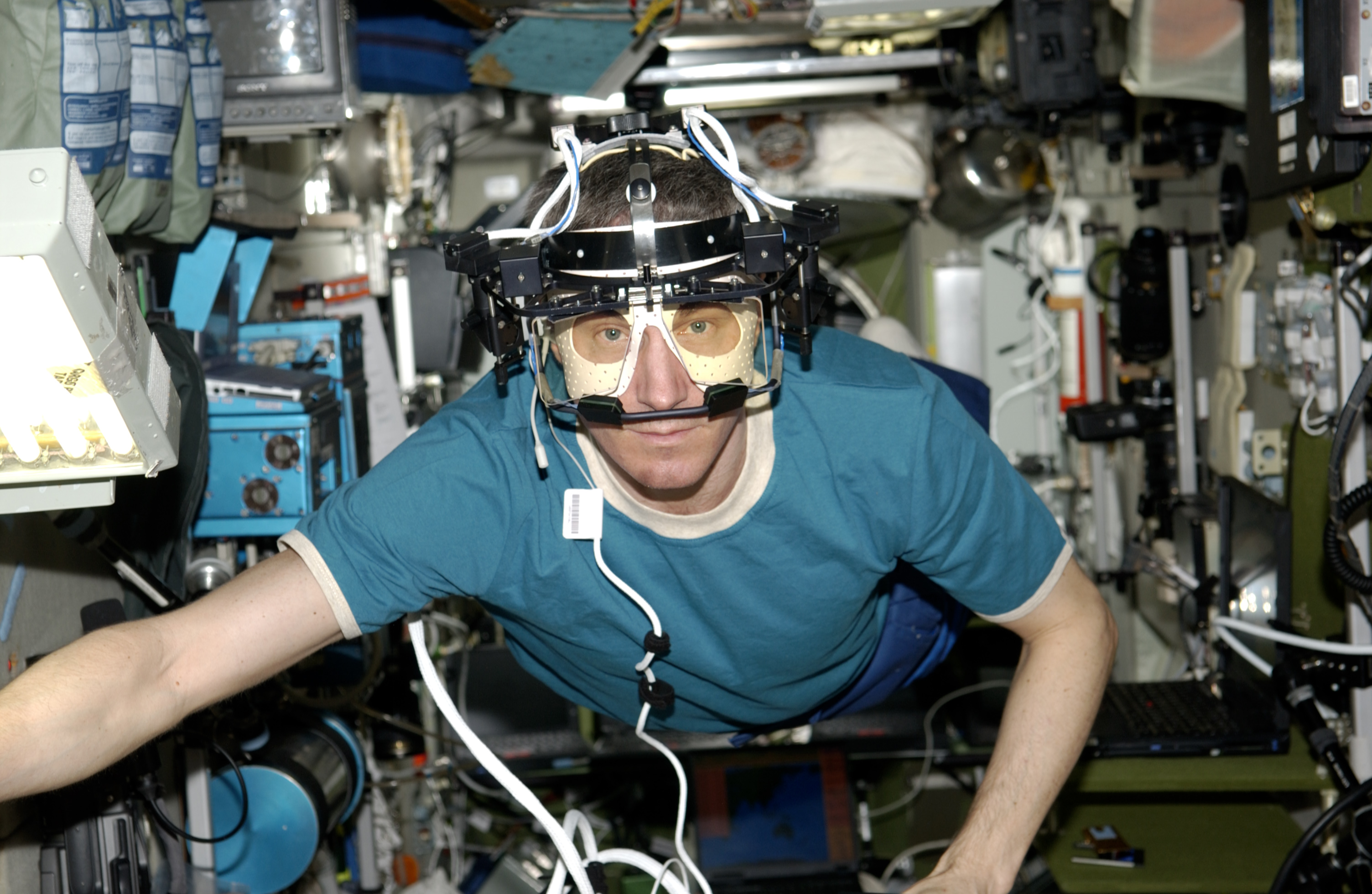
Cosmonaut with the ETD on ISS Expedition

Examination of the orientation of Listing's plane during the course of a prolonged space mission is of particular interest, as on Earth the Listing’s plane appears to be dependent on input from the vestibular system i.e. detected through the head position with relation to gravity. By exposing the astronaut to the weightlessness of space, this experiment can follow the subsequent adaptation of the astronaut’s vestibular system during the flight and after returning to Earth. The key question in this experiment is to what extent the orientation of Listing’s plane is altered by the adaptation of the vestibular system to weightlessness, or under gravitational levels less than or greater than those of Earth. A further question is whether the body compensates for the missing inputs from the vestibular system by substituting other mechanisms during long-term spaceflight.

=== Missions ===
The ETD was employed for this study throughout the period from 2004 to 2008. During each six-month increment the experimental procedure was performed at regular three-week intervals so that the adaptation to microgravity could be evaluated. In addition equivalent measurements were made over the initial weeks after the return to Earth of each cosmonaut or astronaut. In the meantime the ETD equipment remains on the ISS as a general purpose instrument. It is currently in use by a group of Russian scientists from the Institute for Biomedical Problems, who are examining eye and head movement coordination in microgravity.

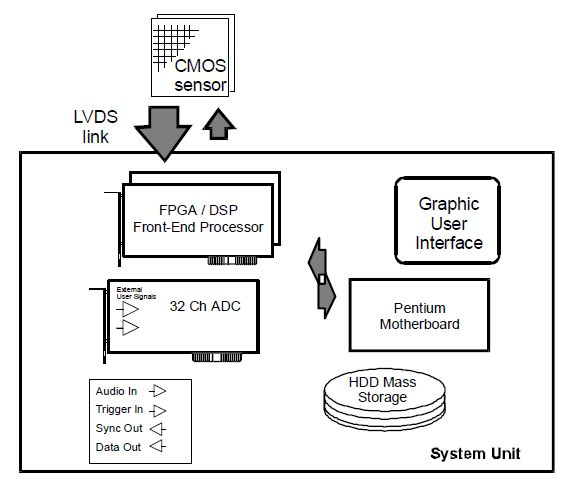
Outline of the principal system components The reconfigurable digital processing circuitry (FPGA) also facilitates inline optimisation of the front-end, time-critical processes.

== Technology ==
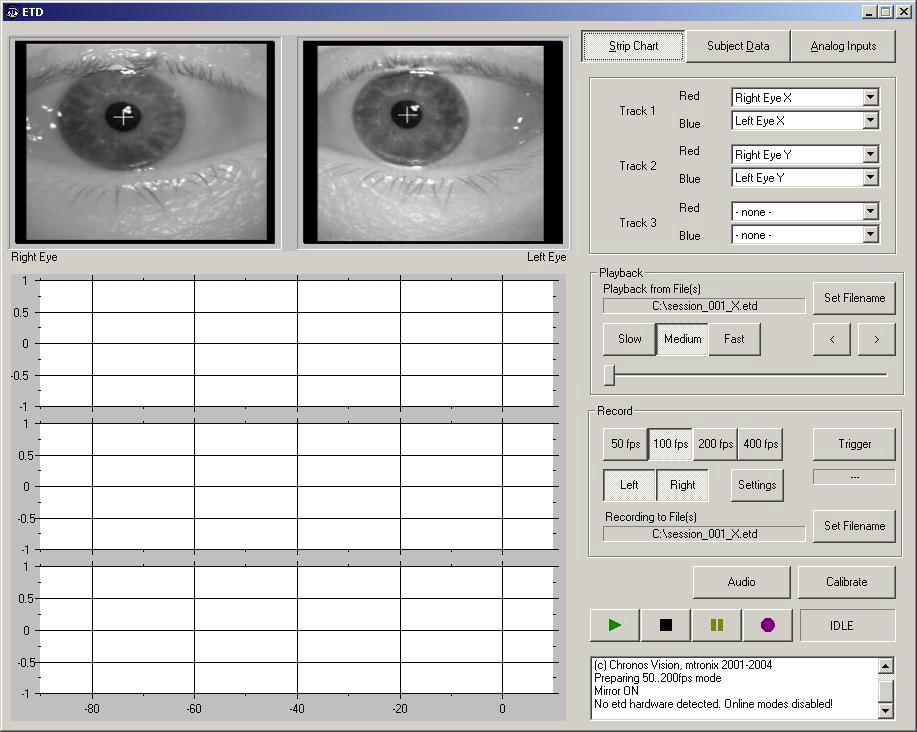
ETD graphic user interface

Digital eye-tracking cameras – designed around state-of-the-art CMOS image sensors – are interfaced to a dedicated processor board in the host PC via bi-directional, high speed digital transmission links (400 Mbit/s). This PCI plug-in board carries the front-end processing architecture, consisting of digital signal processors (DSP) and programmable logic devices (FPGA) for binocular, online image and signal acquisition.

For the eye-tracking task, a substantial data reduction is performed by the sensor and the front-end processing. Thus, only preselected data are transferred from the image sensor through to the host PC where the final algorithms and data storage are implemented. This eliminates the bottleneck caused by standard frame-by-frame image acquisition, and thus facilitates considerably higher image sampling rates.

This processing architecture is integrated into a ruggedised, IBM compatible PC, which permits visualisation of the eyes and the corresponding signals. An important design feature is the digital storage of all image sequences from the cameras as digital files on exchangeable hard disk. After completion of each ISS mission, the hard disk containing the recordings is returned to Earth. This ensures comprehensive and reliable image processing analysis in the investigators’ lab and minimises the time required for the experiment on the ISS.

== Eye-tracking device on Earth ==
In parallel to the space-qualified version of the Eye Tracker a commercially available model has been manufactured by the company Chronos Vision in Berlin and is installed in many laboratories in Europe, North America and Asia, where it represents an essential tool for the examination of numerous neurophysiological phenomena.

== See also ==
- Attention tracking
- International Space Station
- Scientific research on the ISS
- Eye tracking
- NASA
- European Space Agency
- German Aerospace Center
