= Comparison of music education software =

The following comparison of music education software compares general and technical information for different music education software.

For the purpose of this comparison, music education software is defined as any application which can teach music.

== General ==
Name	Author	First public release	Stable version	Cost	Software license	Written in	Notes
EarMaster	EarMaster ApS	1996	6.2	Non-free/Freemium (iOS)	Proprietary		iPad version released in 2016
Flat for Education	Tutteo	2016	37.9.0	Non-free	Proprietary		Web based (Windows, macOS, Linux, Chromebook)
GNU Solfege	GNU Project	2001	3.23.4	Free Software	GNU General Public License	Python	Music theory
Hyperscore	New Harmony Line	2002	5.0	Freemium	Proprietary	C++, TypeScript	Web application released in 2022
InstrumentChamp	InstrumentChamp	2015	1.0	Non-free	Proprietary	C++	
Rocksmith	Ubisoft	November 8, 2011	2014	Non-free	Proprietary		
Synthesia	Synthesia LLC	December 1, 2006	9.0	Non-free	Proprietary		Formerly named Piano Hero
Chordify	Chordify	2012	2.0	Freemium	Proprietary		Chord analysis tool for various music genres

== Operating system compatibility ==
This section lists the operating systems on which the software supports. There may be multiple versions of a player for different operating systems.

Name	Windows	OS X	Linux	iOS	Android	Xbox 360	PlayStation
EarMaster	Yes	Yes	No	Yes	No	No	No
GNU Solfege	Yes	Yes	Yes	No	No	No	No
Hyperscore	Yes	Yes	Yes	Yes	Yes	No	No
InstrumentChamp	Yes	Yes	No	No	No	No	No
Rocksmith	Yes	Yes	No	No	No	Yes	Yes
Synthesia	Yes	Yes	Partial	Yes	beta	No	No
Chordify	Yes	Yes	Yes	Yes	Yes	No	No

== Features ==
Name	Video tutorials	MIDI compatible	Instrument playback	Interactive sheet music	Printable sheet music	Real time feedback	Social media integration	Progress tracking	Onscreen instrument	Modern Songs
EarMaster	No	Yes	Yes	Yes	No	Yes	Yes	Yes	Yes	No
GNU Solfege	No	Yes	Yes	Yes	Yes	Yes	No	Yes	Yes	No
Hyperscore	Yes	Yes	Yes	No	No	Yes	No	No	No	Yes
InstrumentChamp	No	Yes	Yes	Yes	No	Yes	Yes	Yes	Yes	Yes
Rocksmith	Yes	No	No	No	No	Yes	No	No	No	Yes
Synthesia	No	Yes	No	Yes	No	No	No	No	Yes	Yes
Chordify	No	Yes	No	No	No	Yes	Yes	No	No	Yes

=== Extended features ===
Name	Accompaniments	Autoplay	Section looping	Adjustable tempo	Metronome	Song segmentation	Time tracking	Session recording	Music theory	Mini games
Rocksmith	Yes	No	Yes	Yes	No	No	No	No	No	Yes
GNU Solfege	No	No	No	No	No	No	No	No	Yes	No
Hyperscore	Yes	No	Yes	Yes	No	Yes	No	No	Yes	No
InstrumentChamp	Yes	No	Yes	Yes	Yes	Yes	Yes	No	Yes	No
EarMaster	Yes	Yes	Yes	Yes	Yes	Yes	Yes	Yes	Yes	No
Synthesia	No	No	Yes	Yes	Yes	No	No	No	No	No
Chordify	No	No	Yes	Yes	Yes	Yes	Yes	No	No	No

== Instruments supported ==
Name	Guitar	Piano	Drums	Trumpet	Saxophone	Voice	Ukulele
EarMaster	Yes	Yes	No	Yes	Yes		
GNU Solfege	No	Yes	No	No	No	Yes	
Hyperscore	Yes	Yes	Yes	Yes	Yes		
InstrumentChamp	Yes	Yes	Yes	Yes	Yes		
Rocksmith	Yes	No	No	No	No		
Synthesia	No	Yes	No	No	No	No	
Chordify	Yes	Yes	No	No	No	No	Yes

== See also ==
- Online music education
- List of music software
- List of educational software
