= Meludia =

French music education company

- Company type: Société par actions simplifiée (SAS)
- Industry: video game publishing
- Genre: Music technology
- Founded: 2012
- Founders: Bastien Sannac; Vincent Chaintrier
- Headquarters: Paris, France
- Area served: Worldwide
- Products: Web application, Mobile application
- Services: E-learning, Music Education
- Website: http://www.meludia.com

Meludia is a French-based company that offers an online interactive education platform to master the fundamentals of music. The Meludia Method is based upon progressive interactive listening exercises, using two main frameworks designed by Vincent Chaintrier.

- The SEMA model represents the 4 levels of music perception: Sensations, Emotions, Memory, Analysis.
- The 7 dimensions of music represent: rhythm, spatialization, dynamic, form, timbre, melody and harmony.

== History ==
Bastien Sannac and Vincent Chaintrier co-founded Meludia in June 2012. Meludia was further developed in the Cent Quatre, a public cultural incubator in Paris, before being commercially launched in 2014. Meludia is used at The Curtis Institute of Music in Philadelphia. Meludia has also been deployed to entire populations by several countries, like Estonia, Malta, Canada. and the Faroe Islands.

== Awards ==
- Gold Medal and Grand Prix award at the 2014 Concours Lépine for Innovation.
- Gold Medal and Grand Prix award at the 2014 European Concours Lépine for Innovation.
- Grand Prix for cultural innovation at Fabfest Paris 2014.
- Le Web 2013 - Semi-finalist.
- South by Southwest - SXSW Festival Finalists in 2015 SXSW Interactive Innovation Awards in Austin, Texas in 2015.

== See also ==
- Learning music by ear
- Ear training
- Absolute pitch
- Relative pitch
- Audiation
- Tonal memory
- Musical aptitude
- Music education for young children
- Music theory
- Solfège
- List of music software
