= Doctor of Musical Arts =

Doctoral academic degree in music

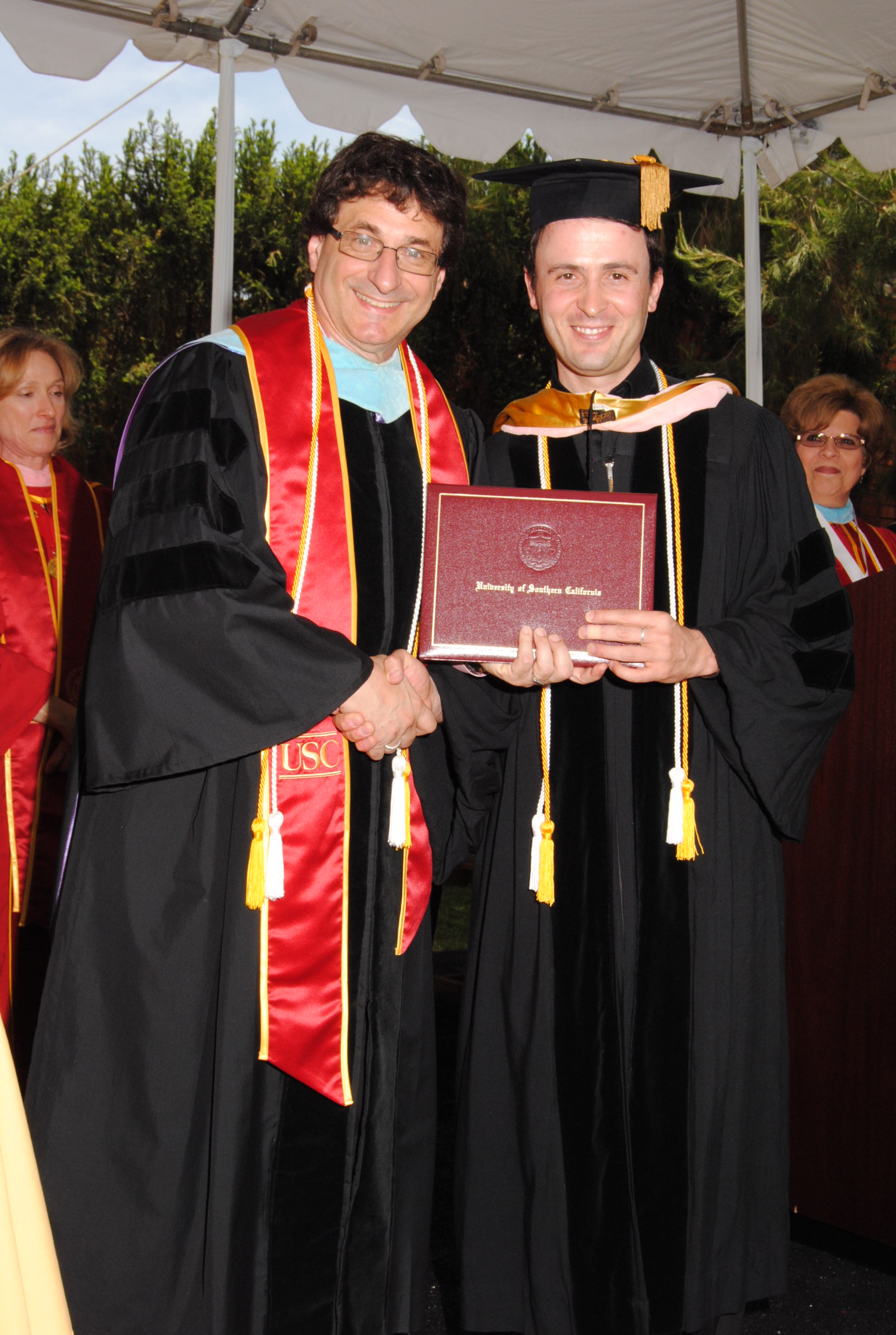
A graduate student from the University of Southern California receiving his doctor of musical arts degree in 2011.

A Doctor of Musical Arts (abbreviated DMA) is a professional doctoral degree in music. For survey and census purposes, it is also classified as a research doctorate by the National Science Foundation (NSF) in order to distinguish it from the Doctor of Medicine (MD) and other degrees that endow its recipients authority to practice in a specific profession (medicine, law, etc.). Like a PhD, the DMA is a terminal degree, but it focuses on the performance disciplines of music rather than on music research (i.e. a graduate in musicology would earn a PhD as opposed to a DMA). The DMA combines advanced studies in an applied area of specialization (usually music performance, music composition, or conducting) with graduate-level academic study in subjects such as music history, music theory, or music education. The DMA degree typically takes three to four years of full-time study to complete (in addition to bachelor's and master's degrees), preparing graduates to become professional performers, conductors, and composers. As a terminal degree, the DMA qualifies its recipient to work in university, college, and conservatory teaching/research positions.

Northwestern University, the University of Michigan, and the University of Rochester were the first to offer the DMA degree, which was approved by the National Association of Schools of Music in 1952.

Students seeking doctoral training in musicology, teaching, leadership, music administration, or music theory typically enter a Doctor of Music Education (DME) or PhD program, rather than a DMA program. The DMA degree is sometimes also abbreviated as DMusA or AMusD.

== Types ==
Approximately 15% of all US institutions accredited by NASM (National Association of Schools of Music) offer the DMA degree. The PhD and DME are generally considered to be more research oriented, while other doctorates may place more emphasis on practical applications and/or include a performance component. Such distinctions among degree types are not always so clear-cut, however. For instance, most programs include traditional research training and culminate in a written dissertation, regardless of degree designation. The music education degree can be a DME, DMA or PhD, each comprising similar research-oriented programs. Also, music education PhD programs may include performance-oriented tracks. In composition, one may study for either the DMA or the PhD, depending on the institution. The PhD is the standard doctorate in music theory, musicology, music therapy, and ethnomusicology.

=== Sacred music ===
A related program is the doctor of sacred music (DSM), also sacrae musicae doctor (SMD), which tends to be awarded by seminaries or university music schools that focus on church music, choral conducting, and organ performance. In the past, some seminaries titled the degree doctor of church music (DCM). Liberty University offers the doctor of worship studies (DWS) and doctor of music education (DME) in church music or sacred music. Only one US institution, Claremont Graduate University still offers the DCM degree, in addition to the more typical DME and DMA. The vast majority of US seminaries have closed their music doctorate programs, but some still offer a master of arts or master of sacred music degree. A new program offered at Perkins School of Theology is the doctor of pastoral music (DPM). While more theology-based and housed within the doctor of ministry (DMin) program, admission to the degree requires applicants to hold a master of music (MMus), master of sacred music (MSM), master of church music (MCM), MA in church music or equivalent 48-semester-hour degree recognized by the National Association of Schools of Music.

== History ==
The Doctor of Music (abbreviated Mus.D. or D.Mus.) is one of the oldest doctoral degrees, and traces its origins back to the mid-15th century at the universities of Cambridge and Oxford. Music was established as a separate faculty during this period, distinct from the traditional Liberal Arts curriculum. The first firmly-authenticated music degrees at Cambridge were conferred in 1464: Henry Abyngdon was awarded the Bachelor of Music degree, and the first Doctor of Music degree was granted that same year to Thomas St. Just, a chaplain to King Edward IV. For centuries, these degrees were "higher doctorates" awarded based on the submission of an "exercise" (an original composition) and a public performance, rather than residency. This historical emphasis on practical mastery provided the precedent for the creation of the Doctor of Musical Arts (DMA) in the United States in 1952.

The doctor of musical arts (DMA) and doctor of music education (DME) are widely available in combination of degrees in performance (sometimes with a specialization in instrumental or voice pedagogy and/or music literature), composition, conducting, and music education. Some universities awarding doctoral degrees in these areas use the title doctor of music (DM or DMus) or doctor of arts (DA) or Doctor in Musical Studies (PhD) instead of DMA. The DMA degree was pioneered by Howard Hanson and the National Association of Schools of Music, who approved the first DMA programs in 1952. Northwestern University (School of Music), the University of Michigan (SMTD), and the University of Rochester (Eastman) became the first to offer the DMA. Boston University offered its first DMA program in 1955. In 2005, Boston University also expanded into online music education by launching the first online doctoral degree in music, a DMA program (along with a Master of Music program) in music education.

In 1952, after six years of deliberation, the National Association of Schools of Music (NASM) approved thirty-two schools for graduate degrees for graduate work "in one or more of the fields into which graduate music study has been divided." The NASM was, and still is, the only accrediting agency for music schools recognized by the American Council on Education. In 1952, 143 music schools had already established standards for undergraduate degrees. The national launch of DMA by institutions meeting criteria was 1953.

- Eastman School of Music (the DMA degree was approved by the State of New York Board of Regents in 1953)
- Boston University
- University of Southern California

The Director of the University of Rochester Eastman School of Music, Howard Hanson (1896–1981), who had been awarded an honorary doctorate in 1925, was one of several high-profile advocates of creating a performance-oriented doctoral degree. Hanson was the Chair of the NASM and Music Teachers National Association (MTNA) Graduate Commission. This commission recommended that the terminal performance doctoral degree be established. This recommendation included that schools desiring to offer this degree seek the Graduate Commission's approval.

In 1953, he published a proposal for a doctor of musical arts degree, which was roundly criticized by Paul Henry Lang, professor of musicology at Columbia University.

Early doctor of musical arts degrees conferred

- 1954: Mathias "Matt" Higgins Doran (born 1921), University of Southern California
- 1955: Will Gay Bottje (born 1925), Eastman School of Music—some sources attribute Bottje as having been the first in the nation to earn the degree
- August 1955: Edward F. Gilday Jr., Boston University

Non-NASM institutions

The alumni of Music conservatories in the United States also seek positions at universities. The conservatories that are not affiliated with the National Association of Schools of Music began offering DMAs in the late 1960s.

- 1971: Margaret Hee-Leng Tan, Juilliard—she is the first woman to earn a DMA from Juilliard; Juilliard added the degree in 1969, the year it moved to Lincoln Center
