= Sight-reading =

Performing music at first sight

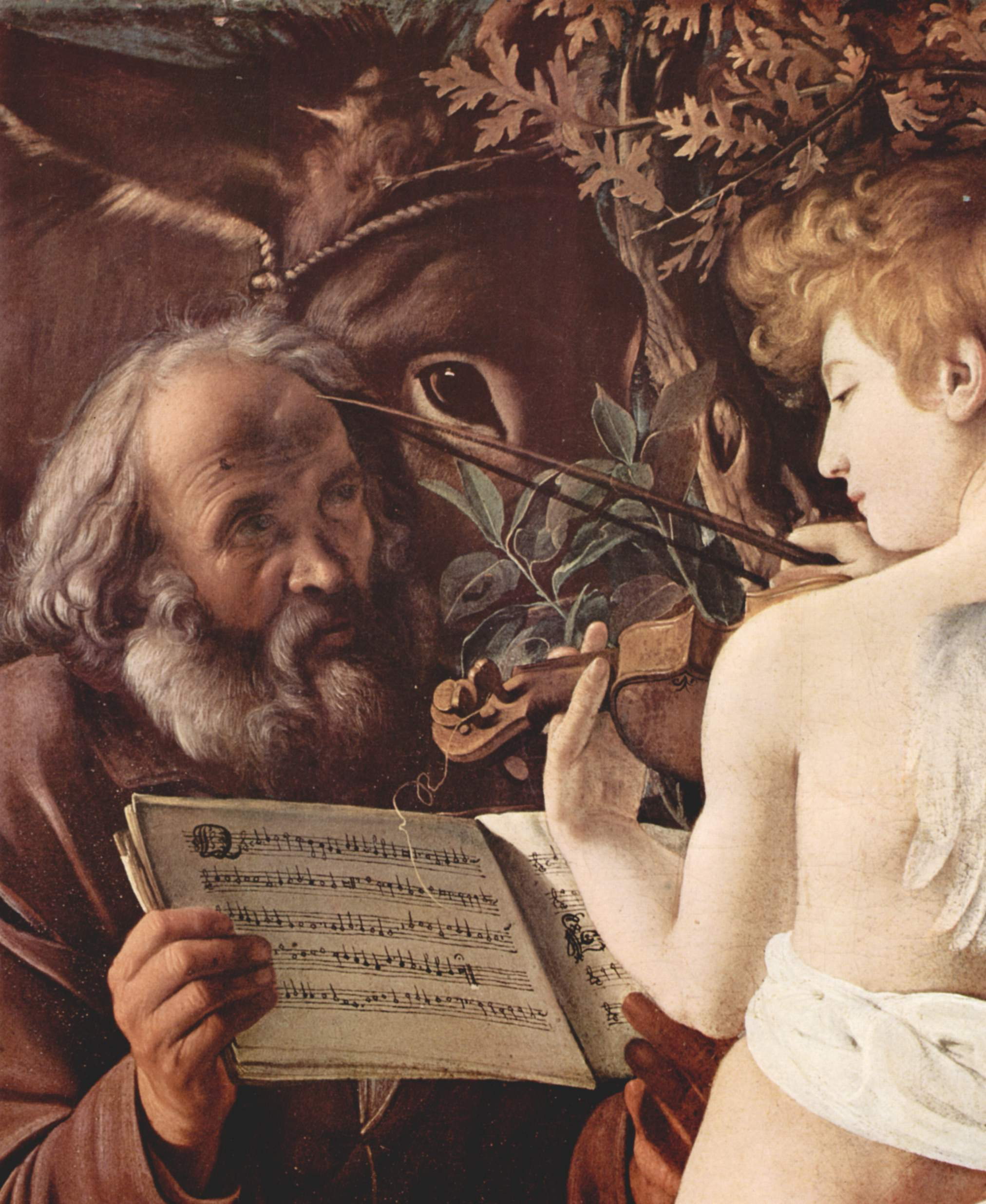
Caravaggio's Rest on the Flight into Egypt (1594–96)

In music, sight-reading, also called a prima vista (Italian meaning, "at first sight"), is the practice of reading and performing of a piece in a music notation that the performer has not seen or learned before. Sight-singing is used to describe a singer who is sight-reading. Both activities require the musician to play or sing the notated rhythms and pitches.

== Terminology ==
=== Sight-reading ===
In music literature, the term "sight-reading" is often used in a generic sense to refer to the ability to read and perform instrumental and vocal music at first sight, which involves converting musical information from sight to sound. However, some authors, including Udtaisuk, prefer to use more specific terms such as "sight-playing" and "sight-singing" when applicable. This distinction allows for a narrower usage of the term "sight-reading" to describe the silent reading of music without producing sound through an instrument or voice.

Highly skilled musicians can sight-read silently; that is, they can look at the printed music and hear it in their heads without playing or singing (see audiation). (Note: True sight-reading or sight-singing—not code-deciphering—is actually notational audiation.) Less able sight-readers generally must at least hum or whistle in order to sight-read effectively. This distinction is analogous to ordinary prose reading in late antiquity, when the ability to read silently was notable enough for Augustine of Hippo to comment on it.

The term a prima vista is also used, as Italian words and phrases are commonly used in music and music notation. To play a musical piece a prima vista means to play it 'at first sight'. According to Payne, "the ability to hear the notes on the page is clearly akin to music reading and should be considered a prerequisite for effective performance ... Egregious errors can occur when a student, analyzing a piece of music, makes no effort to play or hear the composition but mechanically processes the notes on the page."

Music schools generally require sight-reading as part of an audition or an exam.

=== Sight transposition ===
Some musicians can transpose music during performance to suit particular instruments or vocal ranges, to make the playing of the instrument(s) or singing easier, or a number of other uses. For transposing instruments such as the clarinets, trumpets, saxophones, and others, transposing is a necessary skill; for all musicians, it is a useful one.

=== Sight-playing ===
According to Udtaisuk, "many [authors] use the term sight-reading for instrumental sight-reading performance". However, Udtaisuk and some other authors use the more descriptive term "sightplaying" (or "sight-playing") for instrumental sight-reading, because sight-playing combines two unique skill sets: music reading and music making.

=== Sight-singing ===
Some authors, according to Udtaisuk, use the term "sight-singing" for vocal sight-reading. As with sight-playing, Udtaisuk advocates and uses the more descriptive term "sightsinging" for vocal sight-reading because sight-singing combines sight-reading and singing skills.

== Psychology ==
The ability to sight-read partly depends on a strong short-term musical memory. An experiment on sight reading using an eye tracker indicates that highly skilled musicians tend to look ahead further in the music, storing and processing the notes until they are played; this is referred to as the eye–hand span.

Storage of notational information in working memory can be expressed in terms of the amount of information (load) and the time for which it must be held before being played (latency). The relationship between load and latency changes according to tempo, such that t = x/y, where t is the change in tempo, x is the change in load, and y is the change in latency. Some teachers and researchers have proposed that the eye–hand span can be trained to be larger than it would otherwise be under normal conditions, leading to more robust sight-reading ability.

Human memory can be divided into three broad categories: long-term memory, sensory memory, and short-term (working) memory. According to the formal definition, working memory is "a system for temporarily storing and managing the information required to carry out complex cognitive tasks such as learning, reasoning, and comprehension". The paramount feature that distinguishes the working memory from both the long-term and sensory memory is this system's ability to simultaneously process and store information. The knowledge has what is called a "limited capacity", so there is only a certain amount of information that can be stored and it is easily accessible for only a small window of time after it has been processed, with a recall time block of roughly fifteen seconds to one minute.

Experiments dealing with memory span have been conducted by George Miller in 1956 that indicated, "Most common number of items that can be stored in the working memory is five plus or minus two.” However, if this information is not retained and stored (“consolidated”) in one's long-term memory, it will fade quickly.

Research indicates that the main area of the brain associated with the working memory is the prefrontal cortex. The prefrontal cortex is located in the frontal lobe of the brain. This area deals with cognition and contains two major neural loops or pathways that are central to processing tasks via the working memory: the visual loop, which is necessary for the visual component of the task, and the phonological loop, which deals with the linguistic aspects of the task (i.e. repeating the word or phrase). Although the hippocampus, in the temporal lobe, is the brain structure most frequently paired with memories, studies have indicated that its role is more vital for consolidation of the short-term memories into long-term ones than the ability to process, carry out, and briefly recall certain tasks.

This type of memory has specifically come into focus when discussing sight reading, since the process of looking at musical notes for the first time and deciphering them while playing an instrument can be considered a complex task of comprehension. The main conclusion in terms of this idea is that working memory, short-term memory capacity and mental speed are three important predictors for sight reading achievement. Although none of the studies discredits the correlation between the amount of time one spends practicing and musical ability, specifically sight-reading proficiency, more studies are pointing to the level at which one’s working memory functions as the key factor in sight-reading abilities. As stated in one such study, "Working memory capacity made a statistically significant contribution as well (about 7 percent, a medium-size effect). In other words, if you took two pianists with the same amount of practice, but different levels of working memory capacity, it's likely that the one higher in working memory capacity would have performed considerably better on the sight-reading task."

Sight-reading also depends on familiarity with the musical idiom being performed; this permits the reader to recognize and process frequently occurring patterns of notes as a single unit, rather than individual notes, thus achieving greater efficiency. This phenomenon, which also applies to the reading of language, is referred to as chunking. Errors in sight-reading tend to occur in places where the music contains unexpected or unusual sequences; these defeat the strategy of "reading by expectation" that sight-readers typically employ.

== Professional use ==
Studio musicians (e.g., musicians employed to record pieces for commercials, etc.) often record pieces on the first take without having seen them before. Often, the music played on television is played by musicians who are sight-reading. This practice has developed through intense commercial competition in these industries.

Kevin McNerney, jazz musician, professor, and private instructor, describes auditions for University of North Texas Jazz Lab Bands as being almost completely based on sight-reading: "you walk into a room and see three or four music stands in front of you, each with a piece of music on it (in different styles ...). You are then asked to read each piece in succession."

This emphasis on sight-reading, according to McNerney, prepares musicians for studio work "playing backing tracks for pop performers or recording [commercials]". The expense of the studio, musicians, and techs makes sight-reading skills essential. Typically, a studio performance is "rehearsed" only once to check for copying errors before recording the final track. Many professional big bands also sight-read every live performance. They are known as "rehearsal bands", even though their performance is the rehearsal.

According to Frazier, score reading is an important skill for those interested in the conducting profession and "Conductors such as the late Robert Shaw and Yoel Levi have incredibly strong piano skills and can read at sight full orchestral scores at the piano" (a process which requires the pianist to make an instant piano reduction of the key parts of the score).

== Pedagogy ==
Although 86% of piano teachers polled rated sight-reading as the most important or a highly important skill, only 7% of them said they address it systematically. Reasons cited were a lack of knowledge of how to teach it, inadequacy of the training materials they use, and deficiency in their own sight-reading skills. Teachers also often emphasize rehearsed reading and repertoire building for successful recitals and auditions to the detriment of sight-reading and other functional skills.

Hardy reviewed research on piano sight-reading pedagogy and identified a number of specific skills essential to sight-reading proficiency:

- Technical fundamentals in reading and fingering
- Visualization of keyboard topography
- Tactile facility (psychomotor skills) and memory
- Ability to read, recognize, and remember groups of notes (directions, patterns, phrases, chords, rhythmic groupings, themes, inversions, intervals, etc.)
- Ability to read and remember ahead of playing with more and wider progressive fixations
- Aural imagery (ear-playing and sight-singing improves sight-reading)
- Ability to keep the basic pulse, read, and remember rhythm
- Awareness and knowledge of the music's structure and theory

Beauchamp identifies five building blocks in the development of piano sight-reading skills:

1. Grand-staff knowledge
2. Security within the five finger positions
3. Security with keyboard topography
4. Security with basic accompaniment patterns
5. Understanding of basic fingering principles

Grand-staff knowledge consists of fluency in both clefs such that reading a note evokes an automatic and immediate physical response to the appropriate position on the keyboard. Beauchamp asserts it is better to sense and know where the note is than what the note is. The performer does not have time to think of the note name and translate it to a position, and the non-scientific note name does not indicate the octave to be played. Beauchamp reports success using a Key/Note Visualizer, note-reading flashcards, and computer programs in group and individual practice to develop grand-staff fluency.

Udtaisuk also reports that a sense of keyboard geography and an ability to quickly and efficiently match notes to keyboard keys is important for sight-reading. He found that "computer programs and flash cards are effective ways to teach students to identify notes [and] enhance a sense of keyboard geography by highlighting the relationships between the keyboard and the printed notation".

Most students do not sight-read well because it requires specific instruction, which is seldom given. A major challenge in sight-reading instruction, according to Hardy, is obtaining enough practice material. Since practicing rehearsed reading does not help improve sight-reading, a student can only use a practice piece once. Moreover, the material must be at just the right level of difficulty for each student, and a variety of styles is preferred. Hardy suggests music teachers cooperate to build a large lending library of music and purchase inexpensive music from garage sales and store sales.

== Assessment and standards ==
In some circumstances, such as examinations, the ability of a student to sight-read is assessed by presenting the student with a short piece of music, with an allotted time to peruse the music, then testing the student on the accuracy of the performance. A more challenging test requires the student to perform without any preparation at all.

The Washington Assessment of Student Learning has piloted a classroom based assessment which requires 5th and higher grade students to sight-sing or perform on instruments from sheet music they have written. It is suggested that students use solfege or numbering systems or fingering without instruments as aids. 8th graders are expected to sing by sight: "Students are asked to perform a sight-singing exercise of four measures of music. Students will be assessed on their understanding of rhythm and steady beat and their ability to perform in the designated key with accurate interval changes, a cappella."

Many students and adults cannot sight-sing, and even some professional singers cannot sing by sight. However, in combination with an assessment which requires composing music on a staff as early as 5th grade, it is hoped that such a requirement will raise arts achievement. Pilot data show that many students can meet or exceed such standards.

The Standard Assessment of Sight Reading (SASR) is a non-subjective sight reading evaluation method. It was created with a scientific/electronic platform to ensure a non-subjective approach to grading and administering that test. It consists of several thousand pieces of music over 80 graded levels of difficulty that have been reviewed by 135 teachers and students to ascertain the correct difficulty levels. Their scores were averaged electronically in order to insure a scientific approach to graduating the difficulty levels of the music.

== See also ==
- Count singing
- Ear training
- Eye movement in music reading
- Shape note
- Solfège
- Subvocalization

== Notes and references ==
Notes

Sources

- Anon. (n.d.). "Arts Revised Classroom-Based Performance Assessment (CBPA)". Washington Office of Superintendent of Public Instruction. Archived from the original on 19 September 2009.
- Beauchamp, Laura (1 May 1999), "The 'Building Blocks' of Reading: Suggestions for Developing Sight Reading Skills in Beginning Level College Piano Classes", Piano Pedagogy Forum, vol. 2, no. 2, Columbia, South Carolina: University of South Carolina School of Music
- Frazier, Ivan (1 May 1999), "The Well-Furnished Keyboardist", Piano Pedagogy Forum, 2 (2), Columbia, South Carolina: University of South Carolina School of Music
- Hardy, Dianne (1 May 1998), "Teaching Sight-Reading at the Piano: Methodology and Significance", Piano Pedagogy Forum, 1 (2), Columbia, South Carolina: University of South Carolina School of Music
- Manguel, Alberto (1996), "The Silent Readers", A History of Reading, New York: Viking
- McNerney, Kevin (2 May 2008). "My UNT Degrees Came In Handy Tonight". The Musings of Kev: Random Thoughts and Rants from an Everyday Saxophonist – themusingsofkev.blogspot.com.
- Payne, Dorothy (2005), "Essential Skills, Part 1 of 4: Essential Skills for Promoting a Lifelong Love of Music and Music Making", American Music Teacher, Cincinnati, Ohio: Music Teachers National Association (published February–March 2005)
- Sergent, J.; Zuck, E.; Terriah, S.; MacDonald, B. (3 July 1992). "Distributed neural network underlying musical sight-reading and keyboard performance". Science. 257 (5066): 106–109. Bibcode:1992Sci...257..106S. doi:10.1126/science.1621084. ISSN 0036-8075. PMID 1621084.
- Udtaisuk, Dneya (May 2005), A Theoretical Model of Piano Sightplaying components (PDF) (Dissertation), University of Missouri-Columbia, pp. 54–55, archived from the original (PDF) on 15 September 2006
