= Relative pitch =

Ability to recognize musical intervals

Relative pitch is the ability of a person to identify or re-create a given musical note by comparing it to a reference note and identifying the interval between those two notes. For example, if the notes Do and Fa are played on a piano, a person with relative pitch would, without looking, be able to identify the second note from the first note given that they know that the first note is Do.

== Detailed definition ==
Relative pitch implies some or all of the following abilities:

- Determine the distance of a musical note from a set point of reference, e.g. "three octaves above middle C"
- Identify the intervals between given tones, regardless of their relation to concert pitch (A = 440 Hz)
- Correctly sing a melody by following musical notation, by pitching each note in the melody according to its distance from the previous note.
- Hear a melody for the first time, then name the notes relative to a reference pitch.

This last criterion, which applies not only to singers but also to instrumentalists who rely on their own skill to determine the precise pitch of the notes played (wind instruments, fretless string instruments like violin or viola, etc.), is an essential skill for musicians in order to play successfully with others. An example is the different concert pitches used by orchestras playing music from different styles (a baroque orchestra using period instruments might decide to use a higher-tuned pitch).

Compound intervals (intervals greater than an octave) can be more difficult to detect than simple intervals (intervals less than an octave).

Interval recognition is used to identify chords, and can be applied to accurately tune an instrument with respect to a given reference tone, even when the tone is not in concert pitch.

== Prevalence and training ==
Unlike absolute pitch (sometimes called "perfect pitch"), relative pitch is quite common among musicians, especially musicians who are used to playing "by ear", and a precise relative pitch is a constant characteristic among good musicians.

Unlike perfect pitch, relative pitch can be developed through ear training. Computer-aided ear training is becoming a popular tool for musicians and music students, and various software is available for improving relative pitch.

Some music teachers teach their students relative pitch by having them associate each possible interval with the first two notes of a popular song. Another method of developing relative pitch is playing melodies by ear on a musical instrument, especially one that, unlike a piano or other keyboard or fretted instrument, requires a specific manual or blown adjustment for each particular tone.

Indian musicians learn relative pitch by singing intervals over a drone, which Mathieu (1997) described in terms of occidental just intonation terminology. Many Western ear training classes used solfège to teach students relative pitch, while others use numerical sight-singing.

== See also ==
- Absolute pitch
- Tonal memory
