= Play by ear =

Play by ear may refer to:

- Improvisation, the act of inventing all or part of a process as it is performed.
- Learning music by ear, learning how to play a musical piece purely by listening to a rendition of the piece alone, without the aid of printed material
