= List of people with absolute pitch =

This is a list of notable people with absolute pitch, or "perfect pitch".

== Note for pre-19th century composers ==
Owing to uncertainty in the historical record, it is often impossible to determine whether composers and musicians of the past had absolute pitch. Since absolute pitch is rare in European musical culture, claims that any particular musician possessed it are difficult to evaluate. Among composers of the Baroque and Classical eras, evidence is available only for Mozart, who is documented to have demonstrated the ability at age 7. Experts have only surmised that Beethoven had it, as indicated from some excerpts from his letters. By the 19th century, it became more common for the presence of absolute pitch to be recorded, such as in the case of Camille Saint-Saëns and John Philip Sousa.

== List ==
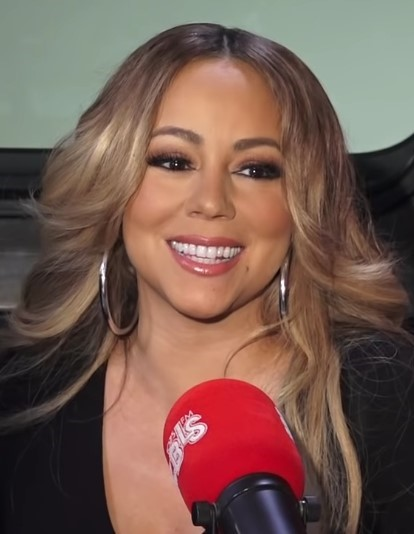
Mariah Carey

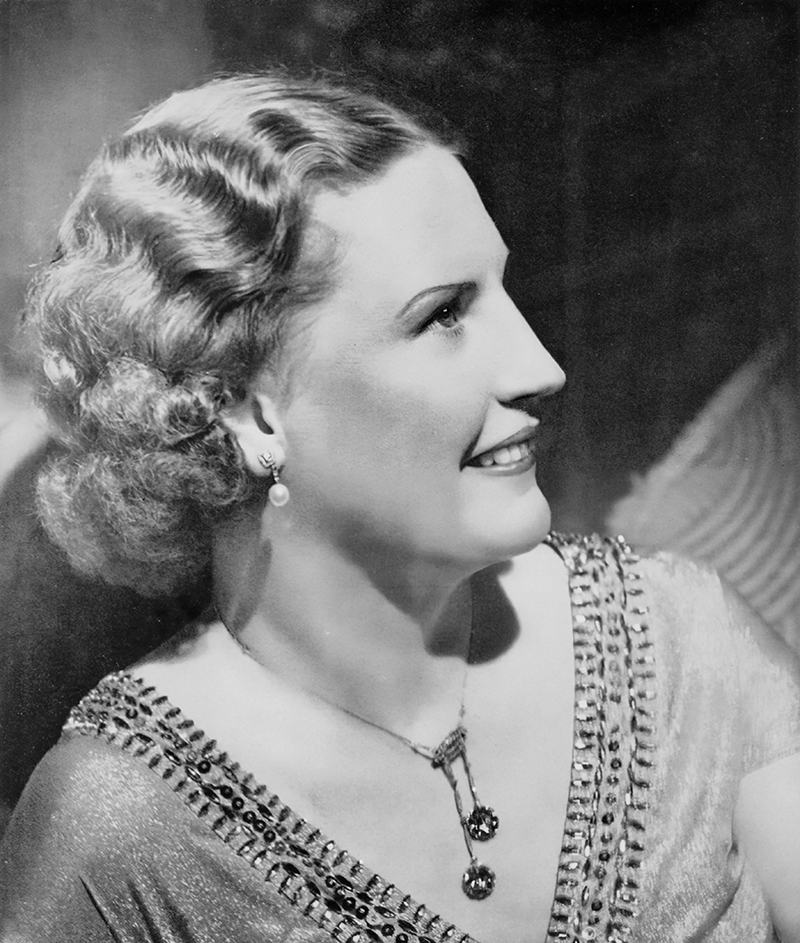
Kirsten Flagstad

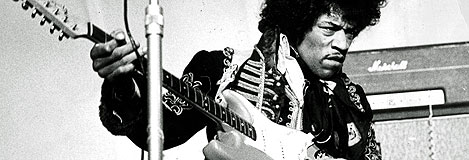
Jimi Hendrix

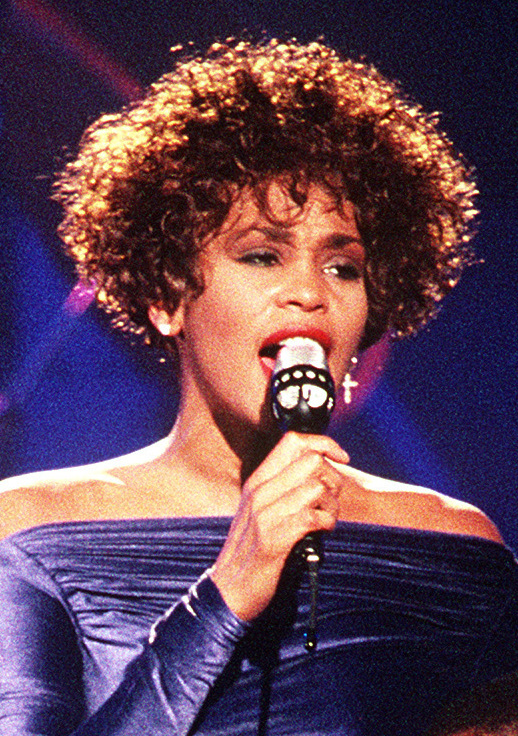
Whitney Houston

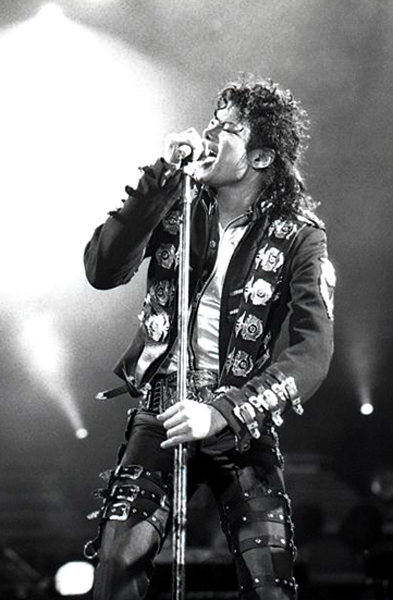
Michael Jackson

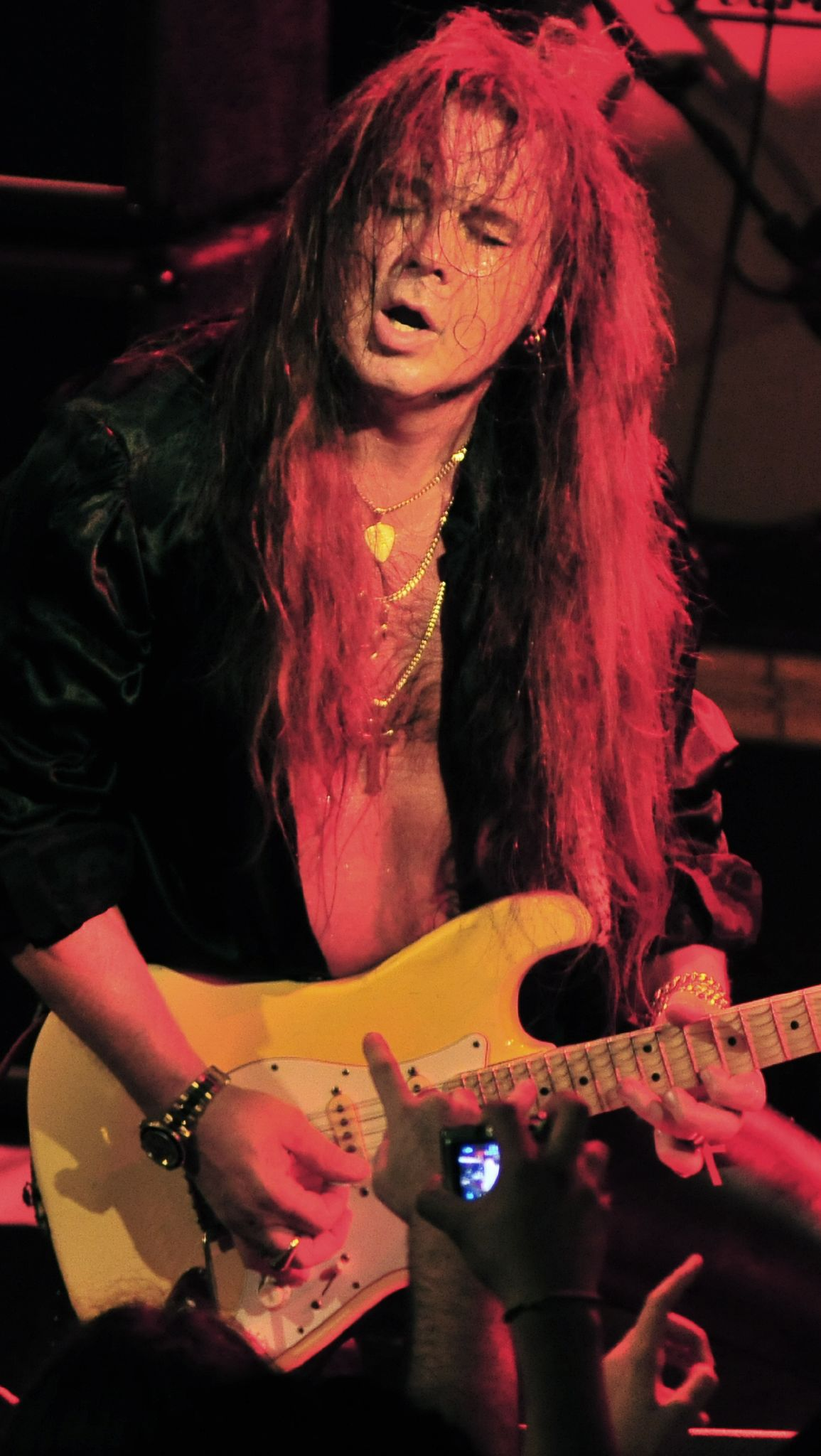
Yngwie Malmsteen

Persons with absolute pitch
Name	Year of birth	Year of death	Description
Bill Bailey	1965	(living)	British comedian, musician and actor
Ludwig van Beethoven	1770	1827	German composer and pianist
Joshua Bell	1967	(living)	American violinist and conductor
Nikolai Bernstein	1896	1966	Russian scientist
Mariah Carey	1969	(living)	American singer, songwriter, actress, and record producer
Ray Charles	1930	2004	American musician
Frédéric Chopin	1810	1849	Polish composer and pianist
Jacob Collier	1994	(living)	English singer, composer and producer
Dahyun	1998	(living)	South Korean singer and actress
Celine Dion	1968	(living)	Canadian singer
Ella Fitzgerald	1917	1996	American jazz singer
Nicolas Slonimsky	1894	1995	Russian- American musicologist and composer
Kirsten Flagstad	1895	1962	Norwegian opera singer
David Foster	1949	(living)	Canadian musician, producer
Charly García	1951	(living)	Argentine singer-songwriter, musician and record producer
Sidney Gish	1997	(living)	American singer-songwriter
Lesley Gore	1946	2015	American singer, songwriter and activist
Glenn Gould	1932	1982	Canadian classical pianist
Jascha Heifetz	1901	1987	Russian-American violinist
Whitney Houston	1963	2012	American singer and actress
Michael Jackson	1958	2009	American singer, songwriter and dancer
James P. Johnson	1894	1955	American pianist and composer
Scott Joplin	1868	1917	American composer and pianist
Danny Kaye	1911	1987	American actor, comedian, and singer
Carole King	1942	(living)	American singer, songwriter, and musician
Dimash Kudaibergen	1994	(living)	Kazakh singer, songwriter, and multi-instrumentalist
Yngwie Malmsteen	1963	(living)	Swedish-American guitarist
George Martin	1926	2016	English producer, composer, conductor, and musician
Gary Moore	1952	2011	Northern Irish musician
W. A. Mozart	1756	1791	Austrian composer
Birgit Nilsson	1918	2005	Swedish Soprano
Frederick Ouseley	1825	1889	English musician, professor
Derek Paravicini	1979	(living)	British pianist, musical savant
Mike Patton	1968	(living)	American singer-songwriter
Itzhak Perlman	1945	(living)	Israeli-American violinist
Lucky Peterson	1964	2020	American musician
Oscar Peterson	1925	2007	Canadian jazz pianist
Charlie Puth	1991	(living)	American singer, songwriter, and record producer
Sviatoslav Richter	1915	1997	Russian classical pianist
Arthur Rubinstein	1887	1982	Polish-American pianist
Jordan Rudess	1956	(living)	American keyboardist for Dream Theater
Lea Salonga	1971	(living)	Filipino actress, singer, producer, and columnist
Sheryn Regis	1979	(living)	Filipina singer, actress, host
Camille Saint-Saëns	1835	1921	French composer, organist, conductor and pianist
Artur Schnabel	1882	1951	Austrian-American classical pianist
James Scott	1885	1938	American ragtime composer
John Philip Sousa	1854	1932	American composer and conductor
Margita Stefanović	1959	2002	Yugoslavian/Serbian classical pianist and rock keyboardist
Art Tatum	1909	1956	American jazz pianist
Arturo Toscanini	1867	1957	Italian conductor
Brian Wilson	1942	2025	American musician, singer, songwriter, record producer, and co-founder of the Beach Boys
Stevie Wonder	1950	(living)	American musician
Yo-Yo Ma	1955	(living)	American cellist
Josef Zawinul	1932	2007	Austrian musician and composer
Jimi Hendrix	1942	1970	American guitarist, singer, and songwriter
