= Numerical sight-singing =

Numerical sight-singing, an alternative to the solfege system of sight-singing, is a musical notation system that numbers the diatonic scale with the numbers one through eight (or, alternately, one to seven, with the octave again being one).

Scale degree	Number	Solfege Syllable	Note if in key of C major
Unison, Octave	"one"	Do	C
Augmented unison	"ouey" ("way")	Di	C♯
Minor second	"ta"	Ra	D♭
Major second	"two"	Re	D
Augmented second	"tay"	Ri	D♯
Minor third	"thra"	Me	E♭
Major third	"three" or "ti"	Mi	E
Perfect fourth	"four"	Fa	F
Augmented fourth	"fair"	Fi	F♯
Diminished fifth	"fahv"	Se	G♭
Perfect fifth	"five"	So	G
Augmented fifth	"fave"	Si	G♯
Minor sixth	"sahx"	Le	A♭
Major sixth	"six"	La	A
Augmented sixth	"sakes"	Li	A♯
Minor seventh	"sahv"	Te	B♭
Major seventh	"seven" or "sev"	Ti	B

In this system, 1 is always the root or origin, but the scale being represented may be major, minor, or any of the diatonic mode. Accidentals (sharps and flats outside the key signature) are noted with a + or - when the numbers are written, but are often skipped when they are spoken or sung.

In some pedagogies involving numerical sight-singing notation students are not taught to modify vowels to represent sharp or flat notes. In these cases the students usually name the note and whether it is flat or sharp. For example, an augmented unison ("ouey") might be called "one sharp," and in some other pedagogies this same pitch may also simply be called "one."

== Comparison with other systems ==
There is a continual debate about the merits of this system as compared to solfege: it holds the advantage that when dealing with abstract concepts such as interval distance a student may easily recognize that the distance between 1 and 5 is larger than the distance between 1 and 4 because of the numerical values assigned (as compared to Solfege, where comparing Do to Sol and Do to Fa remain completely abstract until sung or played). A drawback often pointed out is that numerical numbers are not always "singable," for example, scale degree 7 (ti, in solfege) contains vowels that are hard to tune.

Numerical sight singing is not the same as integer notation derived from musical set theory and used primarily for sight singing atonal music. Nor is it the same as "count singing", a technique popularized by Robert Shaw in which the numbers sung represent the rhythms of a piece in accordance with the beat of a measure.
