= Virtual piano =

A virtual piano is an application (software), or virtual instrument designed to simulate a piano on a computer. The virtual piano is played using a keyboard and/or mouse or a MIDI controller and typically comes with many features found on a digital piano.

Virtual player piano software can simultaneously play MIDI / score music files, highlight the piano keys corresponding to the notes and highlight the sheet music notes.

== See also ==
- Synthesia
- Scorewriter
- List of music software
