= EarMaster =

Music program

EarMaster is a music application for Windows and Mac launched in 1996 by Danish editor Miditec. It has been ported to multiple systems. The name was changed to EarMaster ApS in 2005. The main focus of EarMaster is ear training and sight-singing, even though EarMaster seems to tend towards a more general approach to music teaching since v. 4.0, covering a broader spectrum of music theory and practice.

== History ==
The prototype of EarMaster MS-DOS-based and programmed in 1994 by Hans Jakobsen. The first proprietary version of EarMaster was EarMaster 1.0, released in 1996 by Miditec. It was distributed by Roland in Scandinavia and available in 5 languages.

EarMaster 2.0 was launched in 1997 and was the first version to be commercialized online. In 1998, EarMaster developed the first educational version of its ear training software, EarMaster School 2.5, in collaboration with 29 music teachers.

EarMaster Pro 4.0 and EarMaster School 4.0 follow in 2000, with a new interface and more options.

EarMaster 5.0 was released in 2005 in both a Pro and a School version, first for Windows and later for Mac OS X. The release of EarMaster 5.0 also marks a name change for the editing company from Miditec to EarMaster ApS.

EarMaster 6 was released in 2012, followed by two major updates (6.1 in 2013 and 6.2 in 2015).

In 2014, EarMaster released an educational Cloud solution for e-learning called EarMaster Cloud. EarMaster Cloud enables music schools, choirs and private teachers to give access to the EarMaster application on Windows, macOS and iOS to students and teachers. The solution includes Learning Management System features and Course Authoring Software, making it possible to create and deploy interactive Musicianship assignments and review the results of the students.

In 2016, EarMaster was released on iPad with a completely new UI. The UI designed for the iPad version was also used in EarMaster 7, which was released on Windows and Mac in 2017, followed by a version for iPhone in 2020 which was featured in the App Store in the "Best of the Month - New Apps we love" section.

In 2021, EarMaster was made available as an all in-one subscription including access to all platforms and add-on courses.

In 2022, EarMaster was ported to Android, which made it possible to use the app on phones, tablets and most Chromebooks.

EarMaster Cloud was nominated for a NAMM TEC Award in 2017, a Music Teacher Award for Excellence in 2019 and is used by prominent institutions such as Berklee College of Music in the USA.

== Content ==
EarMaster includes several training modes: workshops with progressive sets of lessons about various music theory and ear training topics, a customization mode, and a beginner's course. While the general workshops are rather general and their lessons focus on most of the aspects of ear training, the jazz workshops focuses exclusively on the particularities of jazz music (e.g. jazz chord, swing rhythms and real book sight-singing). With the customization mode, the user can set up custom exercises for tailored practice. The topics covered by EarMaster are interval singing, interval comparison, interval identification, scale identification, chord identification, chord inversion identification, chord progression identification, rhythm dictation, rhythm reading (sight reading), rhythm clap-back, rhythmic error detection, melodic dictation, melody sing-back and melodic sight-singing.

Questions are answered with on-screen interfaces (staff, piano, guitar, bass, violin, cello, banjo and other stringed instruments), a functional keyboard with scale degrees and solfege syllables, multiple-choice buttons, a MIDI instrument, or through a microphone (voice, clapping or acoustic instruments).

The user can choose between several note-naming systems to complete the exercises: Letters (A, B, C, etc.), Scale degrees, Fixed-Do Solfege, or Relative-Do Solfege, which makes it compatible with the Kodály method.

The results of each lesson are recorded and analyzed in a statistics window. They can be synchronized automatically via the EarMaster Cloud system for instant access by music teachers. EarMaster Cloud is a cloud-based system for music schools developed by EarMaster ApS. It combines online license management and cloud syncing of student assignments and results.

== Technical features ==
EarMaster is distributed electronically as a download. The software is compatible with Windows, MacOS, iOS, and Android (including Chromebook).

User can input answers with a MIDI device by playing their answers. The software also includes real-time pitch detection, which enable users to sing or play their answers and obtain an immediate evaluation of their pitch and rhythmic accuracy.

The sounds played by the software are produced by a SoundFont playback engine and cover the complete set of General Midi (GM) sound presets.

Since version 6.1, EarMaster can import music scores with up to 8 voices in the Music XML format in order to use them in its rhythmic and melodic exercises (for SATB sight-singing for example)

EarMaster includes an editable library with chords, scales, chord progressions, and over 600 Jazz and Classical music scores to be used in custom exercises and assignments by students and teachers.

== See also ==
- Music theory
- Solfège
- Electronic tuner
- List of music software
