= Ear training =

Teaching aural recognition of musical elements

In music, ear training is the study and practice in which musicians learn various aural skills to detect and identify pitches, intervals, melody, chords, rhythms, solfeges, and other basic elements of music, solely by hearing. Someone who can identify pitch accurately without any context is said to have perfect pitch, while someone who can only identify pitch provided a reference tone or other musical context is said to have relative pitch. Someone that can't perceive these qualities at all is said to be tone deaf. The application of this skill is somewhat analogous to taking dictation in written/spoken language. As a process, ear training is in essence the inverse of reading music, which is the ability to decipher a musical piece by reading musical notation. Ear training is typically a component of formal musical training and is a fundamental, essential skill required in music schools and the mastery of music.

== Functional pitch recognition ==
Functional pitch recognition involves identifying the function or role of a single pitch in the context of an established tonic. Once a tonic has been established, each subsequent pitch may be classified without direct reference to accompanying pitches. For example, once the tonic G has been established, listeners may recognize that the pitch D plays the role of the dominant in the key of G. No reference to any other pitch is required to establish this fact.

Many musicians use functional pitch recognition in order to identify, understand, and appreciate the roles and meanings of pitches within a key. To this end, scale-degree numbers or movable-do solmization (do, re, mi, etc.) can be quite helpful. Using such systems, pitches with identical functions (the key note or tonic, for example) are associated with identical labels (1 or do, for example).

Functional pitch recognition is not the same as fixed-do solfège, e.g. do, re, mi, etc. Functional pitch recognition emphasizes the role of a pitch with respect to the tonic, while fixed-do solfège symbols are labels for absolute pitch values (do=C, re=D, etc., in any key). In the fixed-do system (used in the conservatories of the Romance language nations, e.g. Paris, Madrid, Rome, as well as the Juilliard School and the Curtis Institute in the USA), solfège symbols do not describe the role of pitches relative to a tonic, but rather actual pitches. In the movable-do system, there happens to be a correspondence between the solfège symbol and a pitch's role. However, there is no requirement that musicians associate the solfège symbols with the scale degrees. In fact, musicians may utilize the movable-do system to label pitches while mentally tracking intervals to determine the sequence of solfège symbols.

Functional pitch recognition has several strengths. Since a large body of music is tonal, the technique is widely applicable. Since reference pitches are not required, music may be broken up by complex and difficult to analyze pitch clusters, for example, a percussion sequence, and pitch analysis may resume immediately once an easier to identify pitch is played, for example, by a trumpet—no need to keep track of the last note of the previous line or solo nor any need to keep track of a series of intervals going back all the way to the start of a piece. Since the function of pitch classes is a key element, the problem of compound intervals with interval recognition is not an issue—whether the notes in a melody are played within a single octave or over many octaves is irrelevant.

Functional pitch recognition has some weaknesses. Music with no tonic or ambiguous tonality does not provide the frame of reference necessary for this type of analysis. When dealing with key changes, a student must know how to account for pitch function recognition after the key changes: retain the original tonic or change the frame of reference to the new tonic. This last aspect in particular, requires an ongoing real-time (even anticipatory) analysis of the music that is complicated by modulations and is the chief detriment to the movable-do system.

== Interval recognition ==
Interval recognition is also a useful skill for musicians: in order to determine the notes in a melody, a musician must have some ability to recognize intervals. Some music teachers teach their students relative pitch by having them associate each possible interval with the first two notes of a popular song. However, others have shown that such familiar-melody associations are quite limited in scope, applicable only to the specific scale-degrees found in each melody.

In addition, there are various systems (including solfeggio, sargam, and numerical sight-singing) that assign specific syllables to different notes of the scale. Among other things, this makes it easier to hear how intervals sound in different contexts, such as starting on different notes of the same scale.

== Chord recognition ==
Complementary to recognizing the melody of a song is hearing the harmonic structures that support it. Musicians often practice hearing different types of chords and their inversions out of context, just to hear the characteristic sound of the chord. They also learn chord progressions to hear how chords relate to one another in the context of a piece of music.

== Microtonal chord and interval recognition ==
The process is similar to twelve-tone ear training, but with many more intervals to distinguish. Aspects of microtonal ear training are covered in Harmonic Experience, by W. A. Mathieu, with sight-singing exercises, such as singing over a drone, to learn to recognize just intonation intervals. There are also software projects underway or completed geared to ear training or to assist in microtonal performance.

Gro Shetelig at The Norwegian Academy of Music is working on the development of a Microtonal Ear Training method for singers and has developed the software Micropalette, a tool for listening to microtonal tones, chords and intervals. Aaron Hunt at Hi Pi instruments has developed Xentone, another tool for microtonal ear training. Furthermore, Reel Ear Web Apps have released a Melodic Microtone Ear Training App based on call and response dictations.

== Rhythm recognition ==
One way musicians practise rhythms is by breaking them up into smaller, more easily identifiable sub-patterns. For example, one might start by learning the sound of all the combinations of four eighth notes and eighth rests, and then proceed to string different four-note patterns together.

Another way to practise rhythms is by muscle memory, or teaching rhythm to different muscles in the body. One may start by tapping a rhythm with the hands and feet individually, or singing a rhythm on a syllable (e.g. "ta"). Later stages may combine keeping time with the hand, foot, or voice and simultaneously tapping out the rhythm, and beating out multiple overlapping rhythms.

A metronome may be used to assist in maintaining accurate tempo.

== Timbre recognition ==
Each type of musical instrument has a characteristic sound quality that is largely independent of pitch or loudness. Some instruments have more than one timbre, e.g. the sound of a plucked violin is different from the sound of a bowed violin. Some instruments employ multiple manual or embouchure techniques to achieve the same pitch through a variety of timbres. If these timbres are essential to the melody or function, as in shakuhachi music, then pitch training alone will not be enough to fully recognize the music. Learning to identify and differentiate various timbres is an important musical skill that can be acquired and improved by training.

== Transcription ==
Music teachers often recommend transcribing recorded music as a way to practise all of the above, including recognizing rhythm, melody and harmony. The teacher may also perform ('dictate') short compositions, with the pupil listening and transcribing them on to paper.

== Modern training methods ==
For accurate identification and reproduction of musical intervals, scales, chords, rhythms, and other audible parameters a great deal of practice is often necessary. Exercises involving identification often require a knowledgeable partner to play the passages in question and to assess the answers given. Specialised music theory software can remove the need for a partner, customise the training to the user's needs and accurately track progress. Conservatories and university music departments often license commercial software for their students, such as Meludia, EarMaster, Auralia, and MacGAMUT, so that they can track and manage student scores on a computer network. Similar data tracking software such as MyMusicianship and SonicFit focus on ear training for singers and are licensed by schools and community choirs. A variety of free software also exists, either as browser-based applications or as downloadable executables. For example, free and open source software under the GPL, such as GNU Solfege, often provides many features comparable with those of popular proprietary products. Most ear-training software is MIDI-based, permitting the user to customise the instruments used and even to receive input from MIDI-compatible devices such as electronic keyboards. Interactive ear-training applications are also available for smartphones.

== See also ==
- Electronic tuner
- Learning music by ear
- Musical aptitude
- Tonal memory
- Tone deafness
