= Playing by ear =

Ability to reproduce music without seeing notation

Playing (or learning) by ear is the ability of a performing musician to reproduce a piece of music they have heard, without having seen it notated in any form of sheet music. It is considered to be a desirable skill among musical performers, especially for those that play in a musical tradition where notating music is not the norm.

It is a misconception that musicians who play by ear do not have or do not require musical education, or have no theoretical understanding of the music they are playing.

Playing by ear is often also used to refer more generally to making music without using musical notation, using improvisation.

Blues, pop, jazz, and many forms of non-western music are fundamentally rooted in the concept of playing by ear, where musical compositions are passed down from generation to generation. In this respect, playing by ear can also be seen as an instrumental example of oral tradition.

The concept of playing by ear has led to the development of the idiom "play by ear" or "play it [i.e., a situation, treated metaphorically as a musical composition, in which one finds oneself] by ear."

== Method ==
One learns a piece of music by ear by repeatedly listening to it performed, memorizing it, and then trying to recreate what one has heard. This requires the use of several related skills such as ear training, musical perception, tonal memory, audiation, music theory, techniques, and knowledge about the culture of the music one is trying to learn. As such, learning to play by ear involves training those skills as well.

To practice playing music by ear, music teachers often have a student listen to short musical examples which the student will have to write out in musical notation, play back on an instrument, sing, or describe using note names or a solfège system. Musicians will also train their playing by ear skills by taking recordings of full songs and pieces, figuring out the notes by ear, and either transcribing or memorizing them. According to studies playing by ear is associated with a higher level of creativity and musical intelligence.

Audiation is a vital skill for playing music by ear. Edwin Gordon, originator of the term, describes audiation as: "the foundation of musicianship. It takes place when we hear and comprehend music for which the sound is no longer or may never have been present." It is often described as the ability to hear music in your head. In this sense, audiation is to music what thought is to language.

Learning to play by ear, in the sense of making music without notation, is often compared to learning to speak a language. When sufficiently mastered, playing music by ear should be as comfortable and easy as having a conversation. We speak and react to what we hear, without having to think too deeply about every word we use. The same would be true when playing by ear. A musician can produce a sound at the same time they think of it, without having to consider every separate note they play.

== Existence in musical traditions ==
In most instances, traditions in which music is primarily learned by ear do not use musical notation in any form. Some examples are early Blues guitarists and pianists, Romani fiddlers, and folk music guitarists.

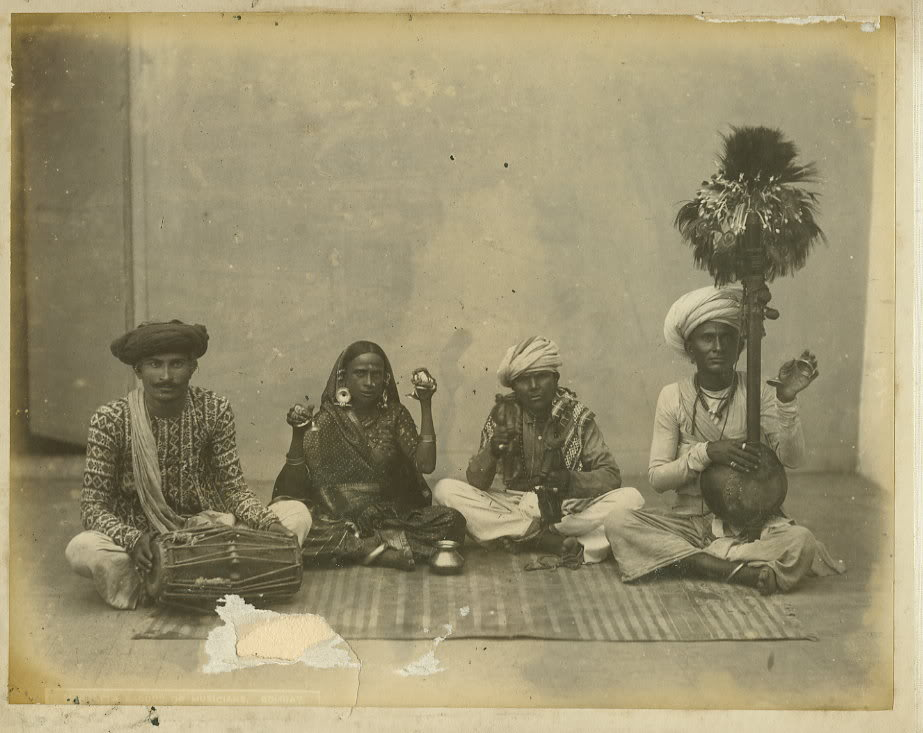
A group of Hindustani musicians (c. 1870)

One particularly prominent example is Indian classical music: the teaching methods of its two major strands (Hindustani and Carnatic) are almost exclusively oral.

=== In the West ===
Historically, the Western classical music tradition has been based on the process of learning new pieces from musical notation, and hence playing by ear has a lower importance in musical training. Before the widespread use of sheet music, much early medieval Western music was learnt by ear, particularly in monasteries.

However, many teaching methods in this tradition incorporate playing by ear in some form. For instance, "ear training" courses are a standard part of conservatory or college music programs (including use of Solfège), and the Suzuki method, which incorporates a highly developed focus on playing by ear from a very young age.

In the West, learning by ear is also used heavily in the genres of folk music, blues, rock, pop, funk, reggae, and jazz. While most professional musicians currently active in these genres are capable of reading musical notation, playing by ear is still widely practiced for a number of reasons. Among those are ease and speed of learning songs, flexibility while improvising and playing variations, and working around the limitations of western musical notation.

Since western musical notation was developed for classical music, musicians sometimes run into issues when musical expressions are commonly used in the genre they are performing but not in classical music. Examples of this are percussion instruments in Afro-Cuban music, where different strokes and techniques are used to produce different tones and timbres, or improvised music like jazz and classical Indian music, where large parts of the composition consists of guidelines for improvisation. Western musical notation can be ill-suited for these situations, and although supplements to musical notation can be invented to try to accommodate this, playing by ear and oral learning are often preferred because of readability, ease, and tradition.

== See also ==
- Fiddle
- Tonal memory
- Ear training
- Musical aptitude
- Music education for young children
- Absolute pitch
