= GNU Solfege =

Ear training software program

- Original author: Tom Cato Amundsen
- Stable release: 3.22.2 / October 2013
- Preview release: 3.23.4 / 24 June 2016; 10 years ago
- Written in: Python
- Operating system: Linux, Microsoft Windows, OS X
- Type: Musical training software
- License: GNU General Public License
- Website: www.gnu.org/software/solfege/
- Repository: git.savannah.gnu.org/cgit/solfege.git

GNU Solfege is an ear training program written in Python intended to help musicians improve their skills and knowledge. It provides exercises in recognising musical intervals, chords, scales and rhythms. It is free software and part of the GNU Project.

GNU Solfege is available for Linux, Windows, and OS X.

== History ==
Amundsen began writing Solfege in the first quarter of 1999 while studying at the Malmö Academy of Music. He started the project after seeing a request on the GNU website for an ear-training program for music students. Solfege became an official part of the GNU Project on 18 June 2000.

The 3.22 series used Python 2 and PyGTK. When announcing version 3.22.2 in October 2013, Amundsen described work on a port to PyGObject and GTK 3. Development release 3.23.4, announced on 24 June 2016, used Python 3.4 and GTK 3. Its release notes listed support for GNU/Linux and Windows, with additional setup required to run it on OS X.

== Exercises ==
- Recognize melodic and harmonic intervals
- Compare interval sizes
- Sing the intervals the computer asks for
- Identify chords
- Sing chords
- Sing tone from chords: root, third, fifth, etc.
- Scales
- Dictation
- Rhythm dictation
- Remembering rhythmic patterns
- Theory: name intervals and scales
- Cadences
- Intonation
- Identify harmonic progressions

This software was made in such way that it is possible for the user to customize the existing exercises or create new ones.

== See also ==
- Ear training
- Music theory
- Solfège
