= Synthesia (video game) =

Computer software to help piano practice

- Original author: Nicholas Piegdon
- Developer: Synthesia LLC.
- Release: October 2006; 19 years ago
- Stable release: 10.9 / 21 December 2022; 3 years ago
- Written in: C++
- Operating system: Windows XP and later, macOS 10.6 and later, iOS 9.3 and later, Android 5.0 and later
- Platform: IA-32, x86-64, ARM ARM64
- Predecessor: Piano Hero
- Available in: 15 languages
- List of languages English, Spanish, French, German, Russian, Brazilian Portuguese, Mandarin, Italian, Dutch, Slovene, Polish, Catalan, Turkish, Japanese, Thai
- Type: Music software
- Website: https://synthesiagame.com/
- As of: November 2024

OS X 10.8.2 running Synthesia 8.5

Synthesia is a piano keyboard trainer for Microsoft Windows, iOS, macOS, and Android which allows users to play a MIDI keyboard or use a computer keyboard in time to a MIDI file by following on-screen directions, much in the style of Keyboard Mania or Guitar Hero. Additionally, Synthesia can be paired with MIDI keyboards that have illuminated keys, or with virtual player piano on screen, which some people believe makes learning piano easier for beginners. It was originally named Piano Hero, due to the similarity of gameplay with Guitar Hero, until Activision (the owners of the rights to Guitar Hero) sent a cease and desist letter to the program's creator, Nicholas Piegdon.

== History ==
Synthesia was started around 2006 by Nicholas Piegdon, and was originally named "Piano Hero". Hosted as an open-source project on SourceForge, it was released under the MIT license.

The program was originally for Windows-only, but after a donation drive in early 2007, it was ported to Mac OS X. An open-source fork for Linux called Linthesia also exists, which is used as a base of other forks to fix compilation issues on recent Linux systems.

=== Cease and desist letter ===
In a letter dated 26 March 2007, Activision requested that Piegdon "immediately cease any and all use of the "Piano Hero" name in connection with the distribution and promotion of [his] video game and agree not to use such in the future". Piegdon responded by hosting a contest for a new name for the project, resulting in the name, Synthesia, suggested by Daniel Lawrence.

=== Continued development as closed-source project ===
After May 2012, Piegdon decided to stop releasing the source code, as he saw the potential commercial value of the program, but the last open-source release version 0.6.1b is still available for download.

The song "Crab Canon" played in Synthesia

In the continued commercial version the basic functionality was still freeware. A "Learning Pack" key could be purchased to unlock the freemium additional features, such as a sheet music display mode. In December 2014, with version 10 of Synthesia, the ability to use the program without purchasing it was removed, with the exception of several playable included demo MIDIs, but an older version can still be downloaded, thus still being able to use the program for free.

== Features ==
Synthesia has support for playing custom MIDI and MusicXML files, as well as linking with MIDI controllers. Synthesia will rate the player's performance afterwards and give a score which can be submitted to an online scoreboard. Synthesia also has a paid "Learning Pack" that allows users to view music in musical notation, as well as multiple practice features, such as "Melody Practice" which pauses the piece whenever the user misses a note and only continues when the right note is played.

== Alternatives ==
- Concertista MIDI

== See also ==
- Scorewriter
- List of music software
