= Hyperscore =

Web-based graphical music composition tool

- A musical sketch in Hyperscore
- Developer: New Harmony Line
- Initial release: 2002; 24 years ago
- Stable release: 5.0 / 2022; 4 years ago
- Written in: C++, TypeScript
- Operating system: macOS, Windows, ChromeOS, Linux, iOS, Android
- Type: Music composing software
- License: Proprietary
- Website: www.hyperscore.com

Hyperscore is a computer-assisted music composition program intended to make the creation of music readily accessible to experienced musicians as well as those without any musical training. To accomplish this, the software maps complex musical concepts to intuitive visual representations. Color, shape, and texture are used to convey high-level musical features such as timbre, melodic contour, and harmonic tension.

Hyperscore has received international media attention and awards. It has been featured in numerous news and journal publications, including the New York Times, as well as television programs such as Scientific American Frontiers.

== Composing ==
Users of Hyperscore compose music by first creating simple melodies or sequences of notes. A library of predefined elements is also provided. These melodies are assigned unique colors. The user then creates a musical sketch composed of colored lines, where each line instances the notes from the corresponding melody. The contour and position of the line alters the pitch at which notes are played back.

The software can optionally use different classes of automated harmonization to organize the given notes, in order to easily generate more pleasing results. The effects of the harmony algorithms can be controlled by contours in a special line presented throughout the sketch. Modulations and sections of harmonic tension and resolution can be introduced in this manner, adding interest and variation to the music.

Hyperscore also provides users with control over tempo and dynamics. MIDI synthesis is used for audible output from within the application and all General MIDI voices are available for use.

== History ==
Hyperscore was originally developed by Morwaread Farbood in Tod Machover's Opera of the Future group at the Massachusetts Institute of Technology Media Lab. Early versions of the software allowed users to generate novel compositions from predefined motives by sketching lines indicating patterns of musical tension. In 2021, Hyperscore was re-developed by Peter Torpey, who earned his PhD in Machover's group at the MIT Media Lab. In the new version, scheduled for release in 2022, the graphical user interface has been updated and the application is web-based so that it will be broadly accessible.

The application evolved to play a prominent role in the Toy Symphony. During an international tour of this project, children were given the opportunity to compose orchestral pieces using Hyperscore, which were then performed in concert along with other works utilizing traditional and technologically enhanced instruments and approaches. Hyperscore was also used extensively in Machover's series of City Symphonies, in which children and adults in cities around the world composed original music that was incorporated by Machover into orchestral works performed by major symphony orchestras.

== Current applications ==
In 2004, Hyperscore became a commercial product under Harmony Line, Inc. The company created H-Lounge, an online music and ring tone-oriented social networking website dedicated to music makers who can upload mp3's or songs they have created with Hyperscore. The company closed in 2017. Subsequently, a nonprofit, New Harmony Line, was formed and acquired the license to Hyperscore. In 2022, New Harmony Line released Hyperscore as a web-based software application available to the public and is now developing standards-based curriculums for music education in grades K-12. A version of Hyperscore was also released through Music First.
