= Eye–hand span =

Distance between eye focus and hand position

The eye–hand span is the distance across part of a text, usually a linguistic text that is being copied via typing or a piece of notated music that is being performed, defined as the distance between the position of the eyes acquiring that information and the hand(s) typing or performing it. Specifically, the eye–hand span is typically measured from the location of central visual input, and stretches between the syllable or chord currently being typed or performed, and the lateral location of the simultaneous fixation. This distance may be measured either in units of linear measurement or in characters or other "bits" of data. Some authors refer to the eye–hand span as the "perceptual span" for the visual information perceivable around the region of center of vision used in reading, and in some cases including peripheral input. The eye–hand span is analogous to the eye–voice span in reading language aloud and in singing.

== See also ==
- Eye movement in language reading
- Eye movement in music reading
- Hand–eye coordination
