= Online music education =

Online music education is a recent development in the field of music education consisting of the application of new technologies associated with distance learning and online education for the purpose of teaching and learning music in an online environment mediated by computers and the internet.

The origins of online music education may be traced to the use of technologies to supplement face-to-face learning in traditional classroom settings, however in recent years it has expanded to include the offering of entire degree programs – even doctoral degrees – online.

The rise of technologies leading to the development of online music education is well documented, and such studies have become particularly popular in the United States in recent years (Schlager, 2008; Webster, 2007). Salavuo (2006) has examined the recent popularization of informal engagement with music technology in online social networks, which may embody a form of informal community music education. The potential of online music education to create positive change in terms of professional development has been noted by various scholars (Hebert, 2008; Sherbon & Kish, 2005); However, concerns have also been raised regarding the absence of a sufficient research base concerning the effectiveness of online music education (Hebert, 2007; Webster, 2007). It is likely that more studies will be seen in this high-growth area in the coming years.

== See also ==
- Duolingo
- Music education
- Online education
- Distance education
- Music technology
- Comparison of music education software

== Bibliography ==
- Hebert, David G. "Reflections on Teaching the Aesthetics and Sociology of Music Online." International Review of the Aesthetics and Sociology of Music 39 no. 1 (2008, June).
- Hebert, David G. "Five Challenges and Solutions in Online Music Teacher Education." Research and Issues in Music Education 5 (2007).
- Salavuo, Miikka. "Open and Informal Online Communities as Forums of Collaborative Musical Activities and Learning." British Journal of Music Education 23 no. 3 (2006), pp. 253-271.
- Schlager, Ken. "Distance Learning." Teaching Music 15 no. 6 (2008, June): 36-38.
- Sherbon, James W. & Kish, David L. "Distance Learning and the Music Teacher." Music Educators Journal 92 no. 2 (2005): 36-41.
- Webster, Peter R. "Computer-Based Technology and Music Teaching and Learning: 2000-2005." In Liora Bresler (Ed.), International Handbook of Research in Arts Education (New York: Springer, 2007): pp.1311-1328.
