= Doctor of Music Education =

Doctoral academic degree in music

A Doctor of Music Education (DME) is a professional doctorate for music education. A DME is expected to construct and resolve relevant research questions in the field of music teaching. The DME combines advanced studies in all aspects of music and music education.

The DME degree usually takes four to six years of full-time study to complete (in addition to the master's and bachelor's degrees), preparing students to be professional teachers, music leaders and professors.

The degree is similar to the Ph.D. program in music education though it may have a more practical focus.
