= Absolute pitch =

Ability to identify musical notes by ear without reference

Absolute pitch (AP), often called perfect pitch, is the ability to identify or re-create a given pitch without the benefit of a reference tone. AP may be demonstrated using linguistic labelling ("naming" a note), associating mental imagery with the note, or sensorimotor responses. For example, an AP possessor can accurately reproduce a heard tone on a musical instrument without "hunting" for the correct pitch. However, pitch labelling is less common than pitch recall.

== About ==
The frequency of AP in the general population is not known. A proportion of 1 in 10,000 is widely reported, but may not be accurate; a 2019 review indicated a prevalence of at least 4% amongst music students.

Generally, absolute pitch implies some or all of these abilities, achieved without a reference tone:

- Identify by name individual pitches played on various instruments.
- Name the key of a given piece of tonal music.
- Identify and name all the tones of a given chord or other tonal mass.
- Name the pitches of common everyday sounds such as car horns and alarms.

Absolute pitch is distinct from relative pitch. While the ability to name specific pitches can be used to infer intervals, relative pitch identifies an interval directly by its sound. Absolute pitch may complement relative pitch in musical listening and practice, but it may also influence its development.

There has been debate as to whether absolute pitch is learnable in adulthood. Adults who possess relative pitch but do not already have absolute pitch can learn "pseudo-absolute pitch" and become able to identify notes in a way that superficially resembles absolute pitch. Some people have been able to develop accurate pitch identification in adulthood through training.

== Scientific studies ==
=== History of study and terminologies ===
Scientific studies of absolute pitch commenced in the 19th century, focusing on the phenomenon of musical pitch and methods of measuring it. It would have been difficult for the notion of absolute pitch to have formed earlier because pitch references were not consistent. For example, the note known as 'A' varied in different local or national musical traditions between what is considered as G sharp and B flat before the standardisation of the late 19th century. While the term absolute pitch, or absolute ear, was in use by the late 19th century by both British and German researchers, its application was not universal; other terms such as musical ear, absolute tone consciousness, or positive pitch referred to the same ability. The skill is not exclusively musical.

=== Difference in cognition, not elementary sensation ===
Physically and functionally, the auditory system of an absolute listener evidently does not differ from that of a non-absolute listener. Rather, "it reflects a particular ability to analyze frequency information, presumably involving high-level cortical processing." Absolute pitch is an act of cognition, needing memory of the frequency, a label for the frequency (such as "B-flat"), and exposure to the range of sound encompassed by that categorical label. Absolute pitch may be directly analogous to recognizing colors, phonemes (speech sounds), or other categorical perception of sensory stimuli. For example, most people have learned to recognize and name the color blue by the range of frequencies of the electromagnetic radiation that are perceived as light; those who have been exposed to musical notes together with their names early in life may be more likely to identify the note C. Although it was once thought that it "might be nothing more than a general human capacity whose expression is strongly biased by the level and type of exposure to music that people experience in a given culture", absolute pitch may be influenced by genetic variation, possibly an autosomal dominant genetic trait.

=== Influence by music experience ===
Evidence suggests that absolute pitch sense is influenced by cultural exposure to music, especially in the familiarization of the equal-tempered C-major scale. Most of the absolute listeners that were tested in this respect identified the C-major tones more reliably and, except for B, more quickly than the five "black key" tones, which corresponds to the higher prevalence of these tones in ordinary musical experiences. One study of Dutch non-musicians also demonstrated a bias toward using C-major tones in ordinary speech, especially on syllables related to emphasis.

=== Linguistics ===
Absolute pitch is more common among speakers of tonal languages, such as most dialects of Chinese or Vietnamese, which depend on pitch variation to distinguish words that otherwise sound the same—e.g., Mandarin with four possible tonal variations, Cantonese with nine, Southern Min with seven or eight (depending on dialect), and Vietnamese with six. Speakers of Sino-Tibetan languages have been reported to speak a word in the same absolute pitch (within a quarter-tone) on different days; it has therefore been suggested that absolute pitch may be acquired by infants when they learn to speak a tonal language (and possibly also by infants when they learn to speak a pitch-accent language). However, the brains of tonal-language speakers do not naturally process musical sound as language; such speakers may be more likely to acquire absolute pitch for musical tones when they later receive musical training. Many native speakers of a tone language, even those with little musical training, are observed to sing a given song with consistent pitch. Among music students of East Asian ethnic heritage, those who speak a tone language fluently have a higher prevalence of absolute pitch than those who do not speak a tone language.

African level-tone languages—such as Yoruba, with three pitch levels, and Mambila, with four—may be better suited to study the role of absolute pitch in speech than the pitch and contour tone languages of East Asia.

Speakers of European languages make subconscious use of an absolute pitch memory when speaking.

=== Perception ===
Absolute pitch is the ability to perceive pitch class and to mentally categorize sounds according to perceived pitch class. A pitch class is the set of all pitches that are a whole number of octaves apart. While the boundaries of musical pitch categories vary among human cultures, the recognition of octave relationships is a natural characteristic of the mammalian auditory system. Accordingly, absolute pitch is not the ability to estimate a pitch value from the dimension of pitch-evoking frequency (30–5000 Hz), but to identify a pitch class category within the dimension of pitch class (e.g., C-C♯-D ... B-C).

An absolute listener's sense of hearing is typically no keener than that of a non-absolute ("normal") listener. Absolute pitch does not depend upon a refined ability to perceive and discriminate gradations of sound frequencies, but upon detecting and categorizing a subjective perceptual quality typically referred to as "chroma". The two tasks— of identification (recognizing and naming a pitch) and discrimination (detecting changes or differences in rate of vibration)— are accomplished with different brain mechanisms.

=== Special populations ===
Absolute pitch is considerably more common among those whose early childhood was spent in East Asia. This might seem to be a genetic difference; however, people of East Asian ancestry who are reared in North America are significantly less likely to develop absolute pitch than those raised in East Asia, so the difference is more probably explained by experience. The language that is spoken may be an important factor; many East Asians speak tonal languages such as Mandarin, Cantonese, and Thai, while others (such as those in Japan and certain provinces of Korea) speak pitch-accent languages, and the prevalence of absolute pitch may be partly explained by exposure to pitches together with meaningful musical labels very early in life.

Absolute pitch ability has higher prevalence among those with Williams syndrome and those who are autistic, with claims estimating that up to 30% of autistic people have absolute pitch. A non-vocal piano-matching method resulted in a correlation of 97% between autism and absolute pitch, with a 53% correlation in non-autistic observers. However, the converse is not indicated by research which found no difference between those with absolute pitch and those without on measures of social and communication skills, which are core deficits in autistic spectrum disorders. Additionally, the absolute pitch group's autism-spectrum quotient was "way below clinical thresholds".

=== Nature vs. nurture ===
Absolute pitch might be achievable by any human being during a critical period of auditory development, after which period cognitive strategies favor global and relational processing. Proponents of the critical-period theory agree that the presence of absolute pitch ability is dependent on learning, but there is disagreement about whether training causes absolute skills to occur or lack of training causes absolute perception to be overwhelmed and obliterated by relative perception of musical intervals.

One or more genetic loci could affect absolute pitch ability, a predisposition for learning the ability or signal the likelihood of its spontaneous occurrence.

Researchers have been trying to teach absolute pitch ability in laboratory settings for more than a century, and various commercial absolute-pitch training courses have been offered to the public since the early 1900s. In 2013, experimenters reported that adult men who took the antiseizure drug valproate (VPA) "learned to identify pitch significantly better than those taking placebo—evidence that VPA facilitated critical-period learning in the adult human brain". However, as of 2005, no adult had ever been documented to have acquired absolute listening ability, because all adults who had been formally tested after AP training had failed to demonstrate "an unqualified level of accuracy ... comparable to that of AP possessors".

A 2019 study reported adults acquiring absolute pitch performance indistinguishable from lifelong possessors. Two of six adult participants achieved accuracy and response times that, when directly compared against a prior dataset of confirmed AP possessors, were statistically indistinguishable from that group, including when analyses were restricted to notes separated by more than one octave. Those findings were independently replicated in subsequent peer-reviewed studies.

=== After injury ===
An American music teacher, Edward Freytag, suffered a brain injury affecting his frontal lobe in a motorcycle accident in 2021. During his recovery, he discovered that he had gained absolute pitch when he had not had it previously. He also began to experience vision-sound synaesthesia, describing the experience as seeing the sheet music for whatever piece he was listening to, and felt a compulsion to compose music but no memory of having done so. These experiences lasted about four months; as Freytag healed, the compulsion faded and he also lost his sense of absolute pitch.

=== Pitch memory related to musical context ===
While very few people have the ability to name a pitch with no external reference, pitch memory can be activated by repeated exposure. People who are not skilled singers will often sing popular songs in the correct key, and can usually recognize when TV themes have been shifted into the wrong key. Members of the Venda culture in South Africa also sing familiar children's songs in the key in which the songs were learned.

This phenomenon is apparently unrelated to musical training. The skill may be associated more closely with vocal production. Violin students learning the Suzuki method are required to memorize each composition in a fixed key and play it from memory on their instrument, but they are not required to sing. When tested, these students did not succeed in singing the memorized Suzuki songs in the original, fixed key.

=== Possible problems ===
Musicians with absolute perception may experience difficulties that do not exist for other musicians. Because absolute listeners are capable of recognizing that a musical composition has been transposed from its original key, or that a pitch is being produced at a nonstandard frequency (either sharp or flat), a musician with absolute pitch may become confused upon perceiving tones believed to be "wrong" or hearing a piece of music "in the wrong key". The relative pitch of the notes may be in tune to each other, but out of tune to the standard pitch or pitches the musician is familiar with or perceives as correct. This can especially apply to Baroque music, as many Baroque orchestras tune to A = 415 Hz as opposed to 440 Hz (i.e., roughly one standard semitone lower than the ISO standard for concert A), while other recordings of Baroque pieces (especially those of French Baroque music) are performed at 392 Hz. Historically, tuning forks for concert A used on keyboard instruments (which ensembles tune to when present), have varied widely in frequency, often between 415 Hz to 456.7 Hz.

Variances in the sizes of intervals for different keys and the method of tuning instruments also can affect musicians in their perception of correct pitch, especially with music synthesized digitally using alternative tunings (e.g., unequal well temperaments and alternative meantone tunings such as 19-tone equal temperament and 31-tone equal temperament) as opposed to 12-tone equal temperament. An absolute listener may also use absolute strategies for tasks that are more efficiently accomplished with relative strategies, such as transposition or producing harmony that is microtonal or whose frequencies do not match standard 12-tone equal temperament. It is also possible for some musicians to have displaced absolute pitch, where all notes are slightly flat or slightly sharp of their respective pitch as defined by a given convention. This may arise from learning the pitch names from an instrument that was tuned to a concert pitch convention other than the one in use (e.g., A = 435 Hz, the Paris Opera convention of the late 19th and early 20th centuries, as opposed to the modern Euro-American convention for concert A = 440 Hz). Concert pitches have shifted higher for a brighter sound. When playing in groups with other musicians, this may lead to playing in a tonality that is slightly different from that of the rest of the group, such as when soloists tune slightly sharp of the rest of the ensemble to stand out or to compensate for loosening strings during longer performances.

=== Synesthesia ===
Absolute pitch shows a genetic overlap with music-related and non-music-related synesthesia/ideasthesia. They may associate certain notes or keys with different colors, enabling them to tell what any note or key is. In this study, about 20% of people with absolute pitch are also synesthetes.

== Correlations ==
There is evidence of a higher rate of absolute pitch in the autistic population. Many studies have examined pitch abilities in autism, but not rigidly perfect pitch, which makes them controversial. It is unclear just how many autistic people have perfect pitch because of this. In a 2009 study, researchers studied 72 autistic teenagers and found that 20 percent of the teenagers had a significant ability to detect pitches. Autistic children are especially sensitive to changes in pitch.

=== Correlation with musical talent ===
Absolute pitch is not a prerequisite for skilled musical performance or composition. However, there is evidence that musicians with absolute pitch tend to perform better on musical transcription tasks (controlling for age of onset and amount of musical training) compared with those without absolute pitch. It was previously argued that musicians with absolute pitch perform worse than those without absolute pitch on recognition of musical intervals; however experiments on which this conclusion was based contained an artifact and when this artifact was removed absolute pitch possessors were found to perform better than non-possessors on recognition of musical intervals.

== See also ==
- Amusia
- Discrimination
- Ear training
- Levitin effect
- List of people with absolute pitch
- Tonal memory
