= Tonal memory =

Ability to remember a specific tone

In music, tonal memory or "aural recall" is the ability to remember a specific tone after it has been heard. Tonal memory assists with staying in tune and may be developed through ear training. Extensive tonal memory may be recognized as an indication of potential compositional ability.

Tonal memory may be used as a strategy for learning to identify musical tones absolutely. Although those who attempt the strategy believe they are learning absolute pitch, the ability is generally not musically useful, and their absolute tonal memory declines substantially or completely over time if not constantly reinforced.

When listening to music, tones are stored in short-term memory as they are heard. This allows sequences of tones, such as melodies, to be followed and understood. There is evidence that a specialized short-term memory system exists for tones, and that it is distinct from short-term verbal memory.

== Research findings ==
In the research article "Memory for musical tones: the impact of tonality and the creation of false memories", Dominique Vuvan and her researchers did three experiments that are focused on music memory specifically single tones with a tonal melodic condition. The result of the first experiment revealed that the responses of test subjects that listened to isochronous tones revealed quality remembrance in expected and unexpected targets in major tonal context compared to moderately expected targets. Vuvan's second experiment used minor melodies that hindered tonal anticipation due to how minor tonality can simultaneously be presented in three forms. The final experiment used atonal melodies that showed how participants were struggling to decipher each musical tone due to the absence of tonal structure.

Lilach's research, along with her colleagues, aimed to experiment on how working memory fully functions when combining memorized music information. In the first experiment, there were nine tone sequences that played at five-hundred meters per second, and it performed five percent more precisely than the nine tone sequences that played at one-thousand meters per second. The second experiment did not have any effective observation of short sequences. This had an opposite reaction, which is why this showed how long term sequences at a faster rate performed better than at a shorter rate. Short sequences were remembered more accurately compared to long sequences that were slow and at a fast rate.

Williamson and her associates created an experiment focused on the study of short-term memory using a structure of working memory to see how distinct and similar verbal and tonal information is processed. This experiment studied amateur musicians' short memory by utilizing visual-auditory senses. It was discovered that irrelevant tones disrupted memory for sequences of tones while irrelevant speech disrupted memory for the sequence of letters. Using the visual-auditory method was proved to be a practical tool for related studies of short term-memory for verbal and tonal medium.

Two researchers Farbood and Mavromatis studied on how tonal conditions influence pitch recognition. This test used melodic sequences in a pitch memory test that is formed on the delayed-tone recognition paradigm. The results of the test showed that many factors such as interference tone, degree of tonality, and tonal fitness of comparison tone showed to be a key factor in how listeners performed in the task.

Vispoel's research journal described an adaptable test that is for tonal memory. There are three phases that were created in order to get the results. The first phase created four to nine notes to provide reliable scores. The second phase used the test to run and evaluate in a computer simulation analysis. Lastly, in the third phase the test was field-tested on the PLATO computer system, and showed that it required an average tonal memory test scores of 6.05, 8.55, and 11.60 items to reach reliabilities of .80, .85, and .90 (4).

== Experiments ==
In the research conducted by Vuvan and her associates, the first experiment aimed to figure out whether the expectancies that are made by tonal melody will affect the memory for single tones. Twenty people were enlisted to be part of the experiment where four of the twenty participants had no musical training at all. These participants listened to an American melody in G-major and right after heard a single probe tone. They were then asked to state whether the probe tone that was heard was in the melody that was previously played. There were a total of 216 trials made to complete the first experiment. In the second experiment, a new group of twenty participants was selected but they all have had years of musical training. The procedure is exactly the same as the first experiment, but the main difference is that the melody is now presented in a minor key. Lastly, the third experiment with a new set of participants who also have experience in musical training. Again, the procedure is the same as experiments one and two but the key difference is that they used an atonal melody for these participants to listen to.

Lilach's and her associates conducted two experiments. In the first experiment, eight undergraduate students were selected who had no musical training at all. They listened to pairs of isochronous tone sequences while simultaneously doing a task to see how accurate they were at completing the task. In the second experiment, nine new test subjects that are undergraduate students were selected and had the same procedure as the first experiment, but with the exception of the length of the sequences that they will be hearing.

The experiment Williamson conducted involved thirty-two people who were considered amateur musicians and had at least eight years of training whether it be instrument or vocal. Each participant had four practice runs and sixteen trials in four different blocks. The four blocks were either silent, white noise, irrelevant tones, or irrelevant spoken digits.

Farbood and Mavromatis's experiment had thirty-four participants who were musicians and had years of formal music training. These participants were on a website that gave multiple-choice questions on every sixty melodic sequences that they had to answer and state from a scale of 1-5 where 1 is "Not tonal" and 5 being "Clearly tonal". After this, all the answers would then be assessed to see how accurate and precise they are for each sequence. In the next experiment, 48 new participants participated in a pitch memory experiment. This new group of people had a mix of musicians and non-musicians. These participants had a survey to take on a computer and also listened to the sixty melodic sequences had to figure out if the first pitch they heard is the same or different from the final pitch that they heard while also only hearing each pitch only once.

Vispoel's research experiment had over 125 people, where 4 were graduate students and the rest being undergraduate students. These participants had to take four versions of a tonal memory test and a questionnaire. Each tonal memory test had 60 items of different types of tones to hear and answer. There were two professional musicians to help ensure that these tests were accurately classifying the tonal and atonal pitches. Each test was unique and had different combinations although it used the same melodies. The session was taken in groups of 5 to 25. There was a practice test given before the actual tests and had a 15 min break after taking the first two versions of the test.

== See also ==
- Ear training
- Learning music by ear
- Music-related memory
- Tone deafness
