= Count singing =

Choral rehearsal technique

Count singing is a choral rehearsal technique that involves singing the correct pitches, but replacing the lyrics with each note's position within a measure. In 4/4 time, this would mean a sequence of quarter notes would be sung as "one two three four" rather than their actual lyrics. Count singing was developed and used extensively by Robert Shaw,and much of its current popularity can be traced back to Shaw through directors who worked with him.

The claimed advantage of count singing is that it simultaneously teaches both pitches and rhythms. In contrast, singing pitches with nonsense syllables removes the difficulty of lyrics but does not aid in learning either pitches or rhythms; solfege and shape note singing emphasize pitches but do not aid in learning rhythms; and counting the rhythm in a spoken form completely ignores the pitches. On the other hand, it can take more mental effort to count sing, particularly for singers who have little experience with it, and the effort of remembering the correct syllables to count with can be a distraction from reading the music or singing it correctly.

== Technique ==
Count singing requires analyzing a piece or section of music to determine how to subdivide it. For example, music written in 4/4 time could be count sung as quarter notes ("one two three four"), eighth notes ("one and two and three and four and"), triplets ("one and a two and a three and a four and a"), or sixteenth notes ("one ee and a two ee and a three ee and a four ee and a"). The director decides how the choir should count, depending on how they want the choir to interpret the music.

Count singing often uses "tee" instead of "three", since it has a simpler consonant at the onset.

Subdivision can change fluidly throughout the piece. For instance, in 4/4 time, count singing would normally be done with the longest-duration counting ("one two three four"), but subdividing whenever shorter notes are used. A measure with 2 eighth notes followed by 3 quarter notes might be count sung "one and two three four". However, longer notes are still subdivided to the longest allowed duration: a measure with a whole note would still be sung "one two three four" if singing quarter notes, "one and two and three and four and" if singing eighth notes, etc. (although the director may call for an exception if a note has a fermata or is the last note of the piece).

Count singing provides an easy way to help singers internalize the desired rhythm of a piece of music. For instance, music in 6/8 time might be counted by sixes: "one two three four five six". The director could tell the choir to stress the "one" and "four" while singing the other notes lightly, to emphasize the duple meter: "ONE two three FOUR five six". The same effect could also be accomplished by counting in two with triplets: "ONE and a TWO and a".
