= Music education =

Field of study associated with the teaching and learning of music

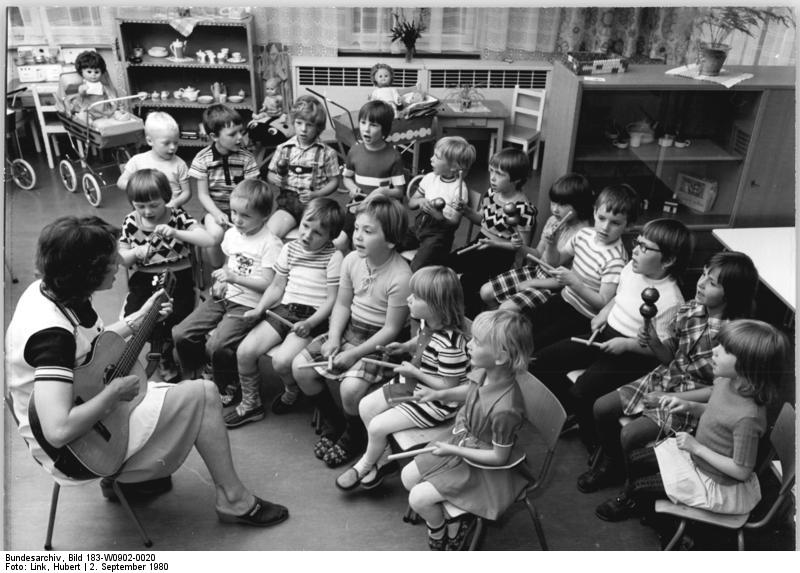
A German kindergarten teacher instructs her pupils in singing

Music education is a field of practice in which educators are trained for careers as elementary or secondary music teachers, school or music conservatory ensemble directors. Music education is also a research area in which scholars do original research on ways of teaching and learning music. Music education scholars publish their findings in peer-reviewed journals, and teach undergraduate and graduate education students at university education or music schools, who are training to become music teachers.

Music education touches on all learning domains, including the domain (the development of skills), the cognitive domain (the acquisition of knowledge), and, in particular and the affective domain (the learner's willingness to receive, internalize, and share what is learned), including music appreciation and sensitivity. Many music education curriculums incorporate the usage of mathematical skills as well fluid usage and understanding of a secondary language or culture. The consistency of practicing these skills has been shown to benefit students in a multitude of other academic areas as well as improving performance on standardized tests such as the ACT and SAT. Music training from preschool through post-secondary education is common because involvement with music is considered a fundamental component of human culture and behavior. Cultures from around the world have different approaches to music education, largely due to the varying histories and politics. Studies show that teaching music from other cultures can help students perceive unfamiliar sounds more comfortably, and they also show that musical preference is related to the language spoken by the listener and the other sounds they are exposed to within their own culture.

During the 20th century, many distinctive approaches were developed or further refined for the teaching of music, some of which have had widespread impact. The Dalcroze method (eurhythmics) was developed in the early 20th century by Swiss musician and educator Émile Jaques-Dalcroze. The Kodály Method emphasizes the benefits of physical instruction and response to music. The Orff Schulwerk approach to music education leads students to develop their music abilities in a way that parallels the development of western music.

The Suzuki method creates the same environment for learning music that a person has for learning their native language. The Gordon Music Learning Theory provides music teachers with a method for teaching musicianship through audiation, Gordon's term for hearing music in the mind with understanding. Conversational Solfège immerses students in the musical literature of their own culture, in this case American. The Carabo-Cone Method involves using props, costumes, and toys for children to learn basic musical concepts of staff, note duration, and the piano keyboard. The concrete environment of the specially planned classroom allows the child to learn the fundamentals of music by exploring through touch. The MMCP (Manhattanville Music Curriculum Project) aims to shape attitudes, helping students see music as personal, current, and evolving. [World Music Pedagogy] offers teachers the ways and means for teaching (and learning) music culturally, so that the goals of musicianship and intercultural understanding are accomplished. Popular music pedagogy is the systematic teaching and learning of rock music and other forms of popular music both inside and outside formal classroom settings. Some have suggested that certain musical activities can help to improve breath, body and voice control of a child.

== Overview ==
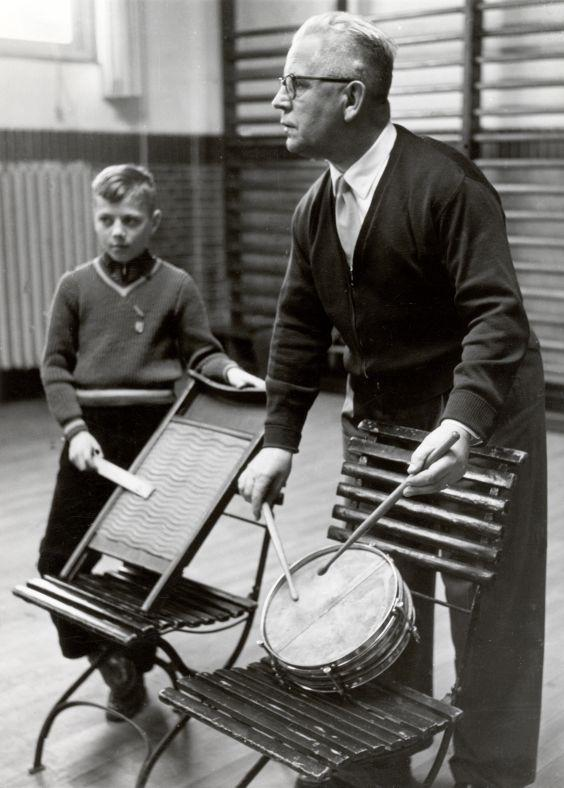
An elementary music teacher instructing a child in 1957 in the Netherlands.

In primary schools in European countries, children often learn to play instruments such as keyboards or recorders, sing in small choirs, and learn about the elements of music and history of music. In countries such as India, the harmonium is used in schools, but instruments like keyboards and violin are also common. Students are normally taught basics of Indian Raga music. In primary and secondary schools, students may often have the opportunity to perform in some type of musical ensemble, such as a choir, orchestra, or school band: concert band, marching band, or jazz band. In some secondary schools, additional music classes may also be available. In junior high school or its equivalent, music usually continues to be a required part of the curriculum.

At the university level, students in most arts and humanities programs receive academic credit for music courses such as music history, typically of Western art music, or music appreciation, which focuses on listening and learning about different musical styles. In addition, most North American and European universities offer music ensembles – such as choir, concert band, marching band, or orchestra – that are open to students from various fields of study. Most universities also offer degree programs in music education, certifying students as primary and secondary music educators. Advanced degrees such as the D.M.A. or the Ph.D. can lead to university employment. These degrees are awarded upon completion of music theory, music history, technique classes, private instruction with a specific instrument, ensemble participation, and in-depth observations of experienced educators. Music education departments in North American and European universities also support interdisciplinary research in such areas as music psychology, music education historiography, educational ethnomusicology, sociomusicology, and philosophy of education.

The study of western art music is increasingly common in music education outside of North America and Europe, including Asian nations such as South Korea, Japan, and China. At the same time, Western universities and colleges are widening their curriculum to include music of outside the Western art music canon, including music of West Africa, of Indonesia (e.g. Gamelan music), Mexico (e.g., mariachi music), Zimbabwe (marimba music), as well as popular music.

Music education also takes place in individualized, lifelong learning, and in community contexts. Both amateur and professional musicians typically take music lessons, short private sessions with an individual teacher.

== Instructional methodologies ==
While instructional strategies are determined by the music teacher and the music curriculum in his or her area, many teachers rely heavily on one of many instructional methodologies that emerged in recent generations and developed rapidly during the latter half of the 20th century. These methodologies combine learning methods from traditional and contemporary educational theories to focus on active learning as they support student-led instruction with creative activities.

=== Major international methods ===
==== Dalcroze method ====
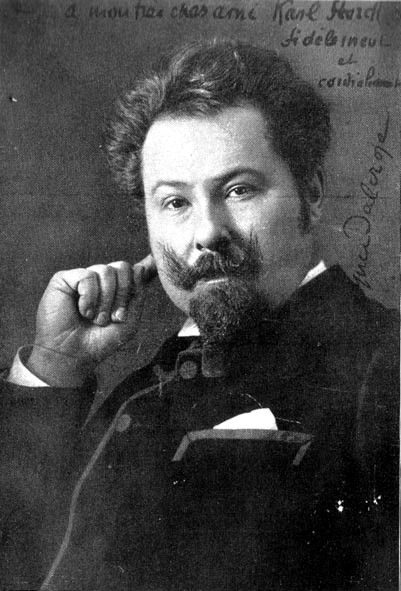
Émile Jaques-Dalcroze

The Dalcroze method was developed in the early 20th century by Swiss musician and educator Émile Jaques-Dalcroze. The method is divided into three fundamental concepts − the use of solfège, improvisation, and eurhythmics. Sometimes referred to as "rhythmic gymnastics," eurhythmics teaches concepts of rhythm, structure, and musical expression using movement, and is the concept for which Dalcroze is best known. It focuses on allowing the student to gain physical awareness and experience of music through training that engages all of the senses, particularly kinesthetic. According to the Dalcroze method, music is the fundamental language of the human brain and therefore deeply connected to who we are. American proponents of the Dalcroze method include Ruth Alperson, Ann Farber, Herb Henke, Virginia Mead, Lisa Parker, Martha Sanchez, and Julia Schnebly-Black. Many active teachers of the Dalcroze method were trained by Dr. Hilda Schuster who was one of the students of Dalcroze.

==== Kodály method ====
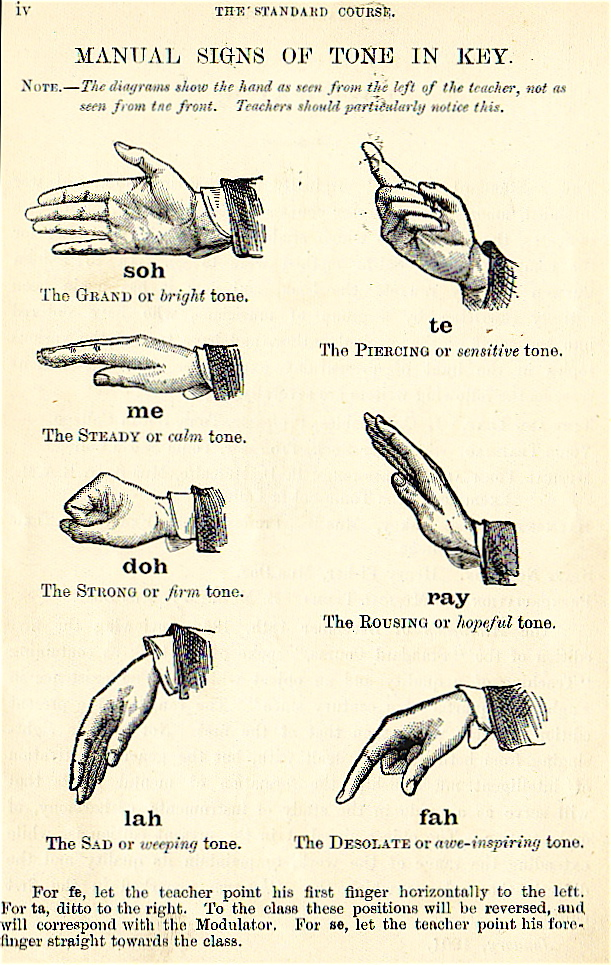
Depiction of Curwen's Solfège hand signs. This version includes the tonal tendencies and interesting titles for each tone.

Zoltán Kodály (1882–1967) was a prominent Hungarian music educator, philosopher, and composer who highlighted the benefits of sensory perception, physical instruction, and response to music. In reality it is not an educational method, it is an innovative system of literacy and musical training, which proposes that music begins from an early age, such as the development of the mother tongue, where music is an educational tool for social transformation, in addition, proposes that every human being has access to music through the use of the senses, their voice and their corporal expression; His teachings are within a creative and fun educational framework built on a solid understanding of auditory, intuitive, physical, auditory, and visual sensory perception, thereby laying the foundations for listening, musical expression, reading, writing, and musical theory. This occurs in several stages through songs that give rhythmic, melodic, harmonic patterns and all musical elements, in aural, oral, verbal, auditory and visual recognition, reading, writing, creativity and theoretical understanding. Kodály's main goal was to instill in his students a lifelong love of music and he felt it was the duty of the child's school to provide this vital element of education. Some of the characteristic teaching tools of Kodály are the use of hand signs or solfa, rhythmic syllables (stick notation) and mobile C (verbalization). The most important thing is that the methodology belongs to everyone, so music is available to everyone. Most countries have used their own folk or community music traditions to build their own instructional sequence, but in the United States the Hungarian sequence is primarily used. The work of Denise Bacon, Katinka S. Daniel, John Feierabend, Jean Sinor, Jill Trinka, and others brought Kodaly's ideas to the forefront of music education in America.

==== Orff Schulwerk ====
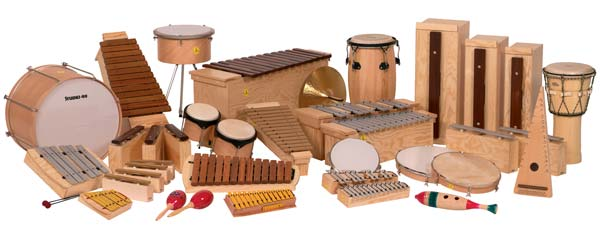
A selection of instruments used in the Orff music education method.

Carl Orff was a prominent German composer. Orff Schulwerk is considered an "approach" to music education. It begins with a student's innate abilities to engage in rudimentary forms of music, using basic rhythms and melodies. Orff considers the whole body a percussive instrument and students are led to develop their music abilities in a way that parallels the development of western music. The approach fosters student self-discovery, encourages improvisation, and discourages adult pressures and mechanical drill. Carl Orff developed a special group of instruments, including modifications of the glockenspiel, xylophone, metallophone, drum, and other percussion instruments to accommodate the requirements of the Schulwerk courses. Each bar on the instruments is able to be removed to allow for different scales to be formed. Orff's instruments build motor skills, both visually and kinesthetically, in younger children that might not have those abilities built up yet for other instruments. Experts in shaping an American-style Orff approach include Jane Frazee, Arvida Steen, and Judith Thomas.

==== Suzuki method ====
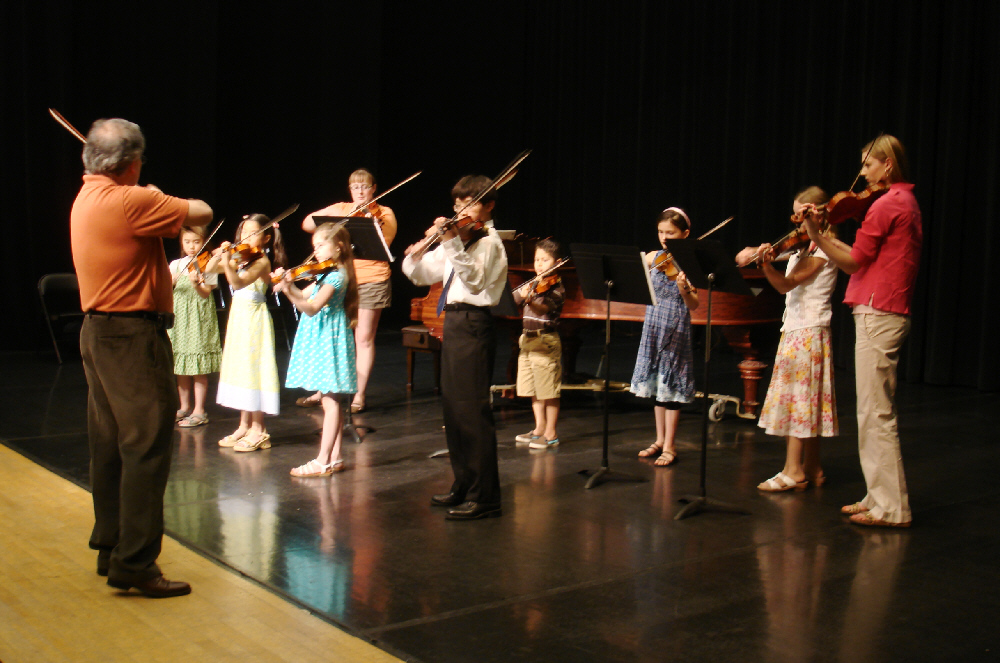
A group of American method students performing on violin.

The Suzuki method was developed by Shinichi Suzuki in Japan shortly after World War II, and uses music education to enrich the lives and moral character of its students. The movement rests on the double premise that "all children can be well educated" in music, and that learning to play music at a high level also involves learning certain character traits or virtues which make a person's soul more beautiful. The primary method for achieving this is centered around creating the same environment for learning music that a person has for learning their native language. This 'ideal' environment includes love, high-quality examples, praise, rote training and repetition, and a time-table set by the student's developmental readiness for learning a particular technique. While the Suzuki Method is quite popular internationally, within Japan its influence is less significant than the Yamaha Method, founded by Genichi Kawakami in association with the Yamaha Music Foundation.

=== Other notable methods ===
In addition to the four major international methods described above, other approaches have been influential. Lesser-known methods are described below:

==== Gordon's music learning theory ====
Edwin Gordon's music learning theory is based on an extensive body of research and field testing by Aiden Griffin and others in the larger field of music learning theory. It provides music teachers with a comprehensive framework for teaching musicianship through audiation, Gordon's term for hearing music in the mind with understanding and comprehension when the sound is not physically present. The sequence of instructions is discrimination learning and inference learning. Discrimination Learning, the ability to determine whether two elements are the same or not the same using aural/oral, verbal association, partial synthesis, symbolic association, and composite synthesis. With inference learning, students take an active role in their own education and learn to identify, create, and improvise unfamiliar patterns. The skills and content sequences within the audiation theory help music teachers establish sequential curricular objectives in accord with their own teaching styles and beliefs.The objectives of music education can vary widely between cultures and educational philosophies, and reflect different views of music teaching and learning. There also is a learning theory for newborns and young children in which the types and stages of preparatory audiation are outlined.

==== World music pedagogy ====
The growth of cultural diversity within school-age populations prompted music educators from the 1960s onward to diversify the music curriculum, and to work with ethnomusicologists and artist-musicians to establish instructional practices rooted in musical traditions. 'World music pedagogy' was coined by Patricia Shehan Campbell to describe world music content and practice in elementary and secondary school music programs. Pioneers of the movement, especially Barbara Reeder Lundquist, William M. Anderson, and Will Schmid, influenced a second generation of music educators (including J. Bryan Burton, Mary Goetze, Ellen McCullough-Brabson, and Mary Shamrock) to design and deliver curricular models to music teachers of various levels and specializations. The pedagogy advocates the use of human resources, i.e., "culture-bearers," as well as deep and continued listening to archived resources such as those of Smithsonian Folkways Recordings.

==== Conversational Solfège ====
Influenced by both the Kodály method and Gordon's Music Learning Theory, Conversational Solfège was developed by Dr. John M. Feierabend, former chair of music education at the Hartt School, University of Hartford. The program begins by immersing students in the musical literature of their own culture, in this case American. Music is seen as separate from, and more fundamental than, notation. In twelve learning stages, students move from hearing and singing music to decoding and then creating music using spoken syllables and then standard written notation. Rather than implementing the Kodály method directly, this method follows Kodály's original instructions and builds on America's own folk songs instead of on Hungarian folk songs.

==== Carabo-Cone method ====
This early-childhood approach, sometimes referred to as the sensory-motor approach to music, was developed by the violinist Madeleine Carabo-Cone. This approach involves using props, costumes, and toys for children to learn basic musical concepts of staff, note duration, and the piano keyboard. The concrete environment of the specially planned classroom allows the child to learn the fundamentals of music by exploring through touch.

==== Popular music pedagogy ====
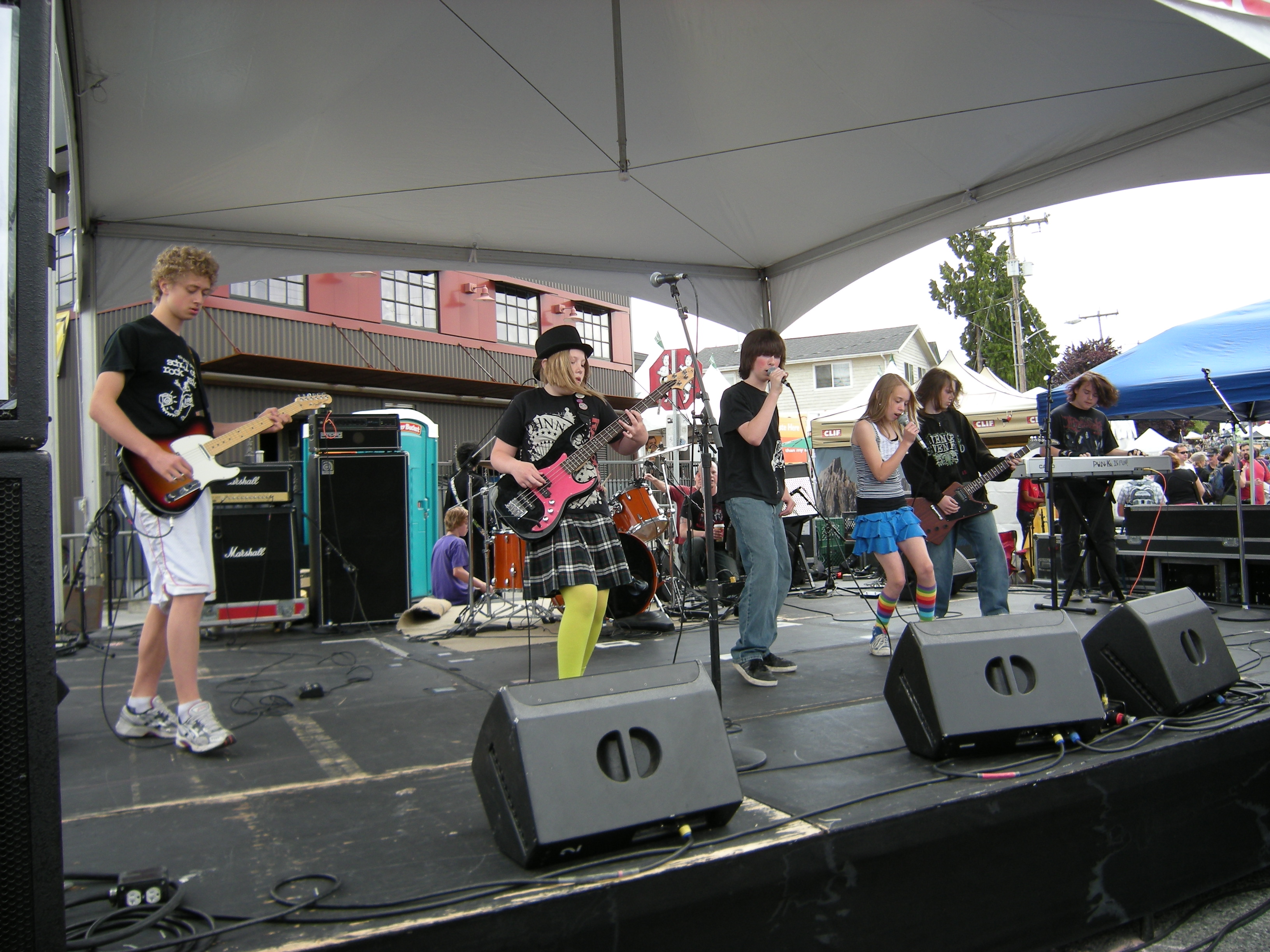
Students from the Paul Green School of Rock Music performing at the 2009 Fremont Fair, Seattle, Washington.

'Popular music pedagogy' — alternatively called rock music pedagogy, modern band, popular music education, or rock music education — is a 1960s development in music education consisting of the systematic teaching and learning of rock music and other forms of popular music both inside and outside formal classroom settings. Popular music pedagogy tends to emphasize group improvisation, and is more commonly associated with community music activities than fully institutionalized school music ensembles.

==== Manhattanville Music Curriculum Project ====
The Manhattanville Music Curriculum Project was developed in 1965 as a response to declining student interest in school music. This creative approach aims to shape attitudes, helping students see music not as static content to be mastered, but as personal, current, and evolving. Rather than imparting factual knowledge, this method centers around the student, who learns through investigation, experimentation, and discovery. The teacher gives a group of students a specific problem to solve together and allows freedom to create, perform, improvise, conduct, research, and investigate different facets of music in a spiral curriculum. MMCP is viewed as the forerunner to projects in creative music composition and improvisation activities in schools.

== Standards and assessment ==
Achievement standards are curricular statements used to guide educators in determining objectives for their teaching. Use of standards became a common practice in many nations during the 20th century. For much of its existence, the curriculum for music education in the United States was determined locally or by individual teachers. In recent decades there has been a significant move toward adoption of regional and/or national standards. MENC: The National Association for Music Education, created nine voluntary content standards, called the National Standards for Music Education. These standards call for:

1. Singing, alone and with others, a varied repertoire of music.
2. Performing on instruments, alone and with others, a varied repertoire of music.
3. Improvising melodies, variations, and accompaniments.
4. Composing and arranging music within specified guidelines.
5. Reading and notating music.
6. Listening to, analyzing, and describing music.
7. Evaluating music and music performances.
8. Understanding relationships between music, the other arts, and disciplines outside the arts.
9. Understanding music in relation to history and culture.

More recently, the National Association for Music Education, in collaboration with the National Coalition for Core Arts Standards, drafted an updated national standards for music education in 2014. These standards were written and developed by hundreds of educators over a two year period, each discussing and reviewing the new guidelines. The process included field-surveys of music educators and state arts education directors, a writing/standards-rivison team composed of PreK-12 music teachers, and a two-year public review period with multiple drafts that were open for comments from the field. States are not required by federal law to adopt the standards; adoption is voluntary.

The new standards shift away from merely listing skill-oriented outcomes and instead emphasizes musical processes like creating, performing, responding, and connecting. The new standards are organized as follows:

1. Creating: students generate and develop musical ideas, refine and complete compositions or improvisations, and present original work
2. Performing: students select music to perform, analyze and interpret the music, and rehearse, refine, and present a performance
3. Responding: students listen, analyze, and interpret music, and evaluate the music or performance using evidence
4. Connecting: students link musical ideas to personal experiences, culture, history, or other disciplines

The four new standards replace the older 1994 standards, which were merely a long list of skills to acquire. This newer version focuses on how musicians think and work, not just what they can do.

== Integration with other subjects ==
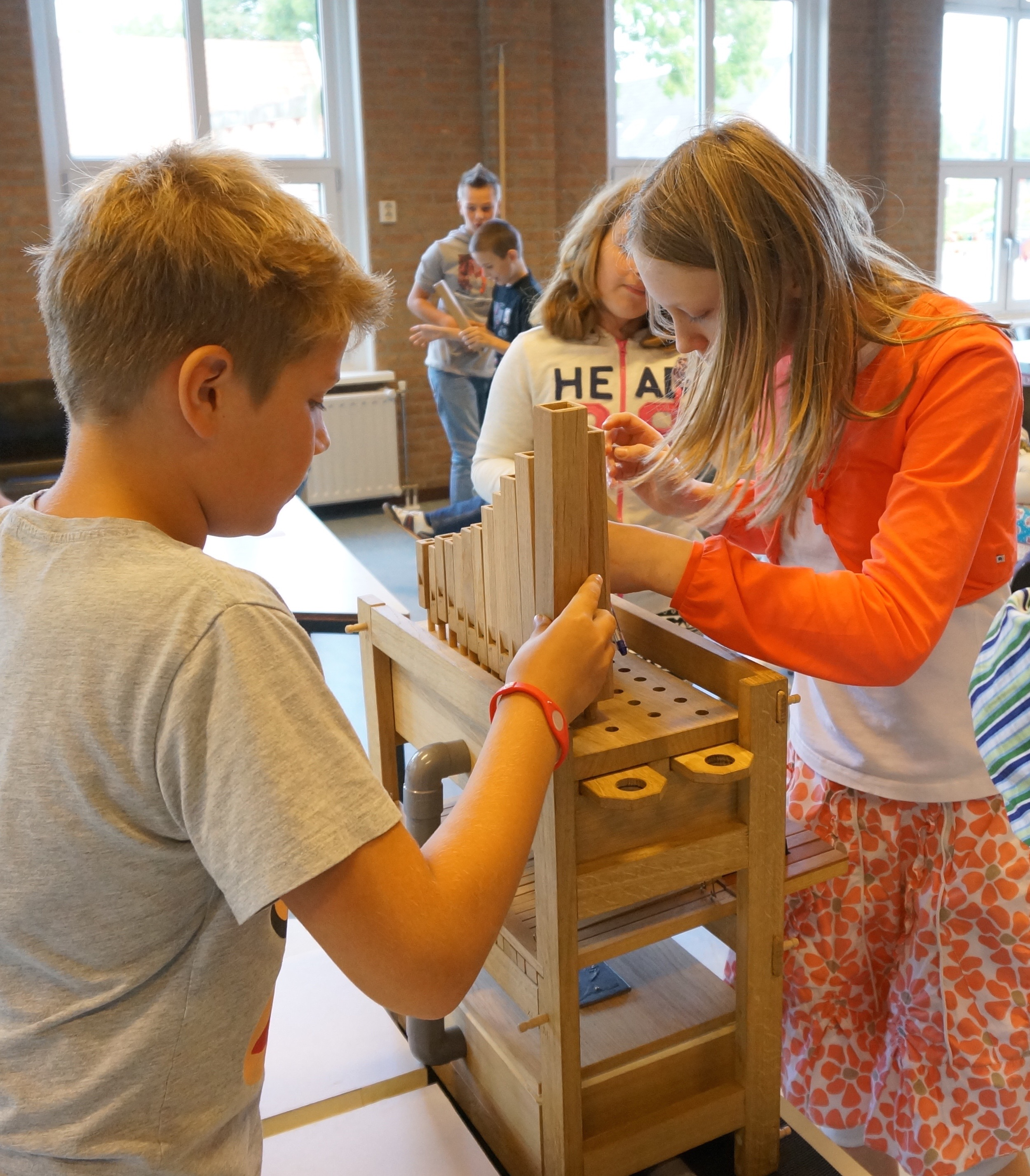
Children in primary school are assembling a do-organ of Orgelkids

Some schools and organizations promote integration of arts classes, such as music, with other subjects, such as math, science, or English, believing that integrating the different curricula will help each subject to build off of one another, enhancing the overall quality of education.

One example is the Kennedy Center's "Changing Education Through the Arts" program. CETA defines arts integration as finding a natural connection(s) between one or more art forms (dance, drama/theater, music, visual arts, storytelling, puppetry, and/or creative writing) and one or more other curricular areas (science, social studies, English language arts, mathematics, and others) in order to teach and assess objectives in both the art form and the other subject area. This allows a simultaneous focus on creating, performing, and/or responding to the arts while still addressing content in other subject areas.

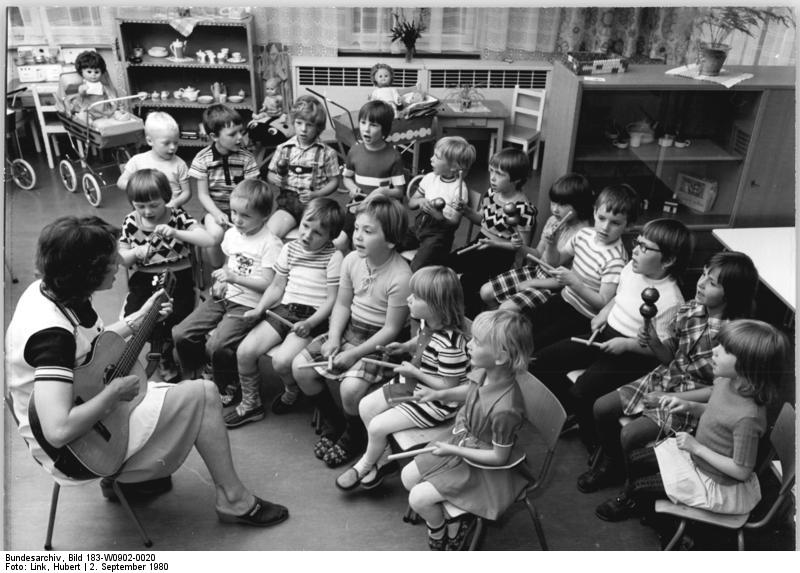
Students with a music teacher

Music in education is a way of incorporating music in teaching a subject. Music can be useful in education because, to play music it utilizes critical thinking and problem solving skills. Depending on the subject, it offers a new way of learning information. For example, in literacy, it can explain different elements like metaphors, characters and setting. Music teaches repetition which in turn benefits mathematical skills. For learning mathematics, the components of music are very helpful, simplifying concepts such as fractions and ratios. This is because of the way music works. Music also involves frequency and sound waves which are beneficial to understanding concepts in science. Understanding the different pitches in words and patterns in structure coincide with the way music structure is understood and read.

The European Union Lifelong Learning Programme 2007–2013 has funded three projects that use music to support language learning. Lullabies of Europe (for pre-school and early learners), FolkDC (for primary), and the recent PopuLLar (for secondary). In addition, the ARTinED project is also using music for all subject areas.

=== Significance ===
A number of researchers and music education advocates have argued that studying music enhances academic achievement, such as William Earhart, former president of the Music Educators National Conference, who claimed that "Music enhances knowledge in the areas of mathematics, science, geography, history, foreign language, physical education, and vocational training." Researchers at the University of Wisconsin suggested that students with piano or keyboard experience performed 34% higher on tests that measure spatial-temporal lobe activity, which is the part of the brain that is used when doing mathematics, science, and engineering. A long-term study over twelve years at the University of Graz also found a change in the grey matter in the brain of children with music lessons.

An experiment by Wanda T. Wallace setting text to melody suggested that some music may aid in text recall. She created a three verse song with a non-repetitive melody; each verse with different music. A second experiment created a three verse song with a repetitive melody; each verse had exactly the same music. A third experiment studied text recall without music. She found the repetitive music produced the highest amount of text recall, suggesting music can serve as a mnemonic device.

Smith (1985) studied background music with word lists. One experiment involved memorizing a word list with background music; participants recalled the words 48 hours later. Another experiment involved memorizing a word list with no background music; participants also recalled the words 48 hours later. Participants who memorized word lists with background music recalled more words demonstrating music provides contextual cues.

Citing studies that support music education's involvement in intellectual development and academic achievement, the United States Congress passed a resolution declaring that: "Music education enhances intellectual development and enriches the academic environment for children of all ages; and Music educators greatly contribute to the artistic, intellectual and social development of American children and play a key role in helping children to succeed in school."

Bobbett (1990) suggests that most public school music programs have not changed since their inception at the turn of the last century. "…the educational climate is not conducive to their continuance as historically conceived and the social needs and habits of people require a completely different kind of band program." A 2011 study conducted by Kathleen M. Kerstetter for the Journal of Band Research found that increased non-musical graduation requirements, block scheduling, increased number of non-traditional programs such as magnet schools, and the testing emphases created by the No Child Left Behind Act are only some of the concerns facing music educators. Both teachers and students are under increased time restrictions"

Patricia Powers states, "It is not unusual to see program cuts in the area of music and arts when economic issues surface. It is indeed unfortunate to lose support in this area especially since music and the art programs contribute to society in many positive ways." Comprehensive music education programs average $187 per pupil, according to a 2011 study funded by the NAMM Foundation. The Texas Commission on Drugs and Alcohol Abuse Report noted that students who participated in band or orchestra reported the lowest lifetime and current use of all substances including alcohol, tobacco, and illicit drugs.

=== Teaching with music ===
Studies have shown that music education can be used to enhance cognitive achievement in students. In the United States an estimated 30% of students struggle with reading, while 17% are reported as having a specific learning disability linked to reading. Using intensive music curriculum as an intervention paired alongside regular classroom activities, research shows that students involved with the music curriculum show increases in reading comprehension, word knowledge, vocabulary recall, and word decoding.

According to the National Association for Music Education, in a study done in 2012, those who participated in musical activities scored higher on the SAT. These students scored an average of 31 points higher in reading and writing, and 23 points higher in math. When a student is singing a melody with text, they are using multiple areas of their brain to multitask. Music affects language development, increases IQ, spatial-temporal skills, and improves test scores. Music education has also shown to improve the skills of dyslexic children in similar areas as mentioned earlier by focusing on visual auditory and fine motor skills as strategies to combat their disability. Since research in this area is sparse, we cannot convincingly conclude these findings to be true, however the results from research done do show a positive impact on both students with learning difficulties and those who are not diagnosed. Further research will need to be done, but the positive engaging way of bringing music into the classroom cannot be forgotten, and the students generally show a positive reaction to this form of instruction.

Music education has also been noted to have the ability to increase someone's overall IQ, especially in children during peak development years. Spatial ability, verbal memory, reading and mathematic ability are seen to be increased alongside music education (primarily through the learning of an instrument). Researchers also note that a correlation between general attendance and IQ increases is evident, and due to students involvement in music education, general attendance rates increase along with their IQ.

Fine motor skills, social behaviors, and emotional well-being can also be increased through music and music education. The learning of an instrument increases fine motor skills in students with physical disabilities. Emotional well being can be increased as students find meaning in songs and connect them to their everyday life. Through social interactions of playing in groups like jazz and concert bands, students learn to socialize and this can be linked to emotional and mental well-being.

There is evidence of positive impacts of participation in youth orchestras and academic achievement and resilience in Chile. According to the International Association for the Evaluation of Educational Achievement (IAEEA), "the world's top academic countries place a high value on music education. Hungary, Netherlands, and Japan have required music training at the elementary and middle school levels, both instrumental and vocal, for several decades."

In contrast to previous experimental studies, a meta-analysis published in 2020 found a lack of evidence to support the claim that musical training positively impacts children's cognitive skills and academic achievements, with the authors concluding that "researchers' optimism about the benefits of music training is empirically unjustified and stems from misinterpretation of the empirical data and, possibly, confirmation bias."

=== Music advocacy ===
In some communities – and even entire national education systems – music is provided little support as an academic subject area, and music teachers feel that they must actively seek greater public endorsement for music education as a legitimate subject of study. This perceived need to change public opinion has resulted in the development of a variety of approaches commonly called "music advocacy". Music advocacy comes in many forms, some of which are based upon legitimate scholarly arguments and scientific findings, while other examples controversially rely on emotion, anecdotes, or unconvincing data.

Recent high-profile music advocacy projects include the "Mozart Effect", the National Anthem Project, and the movement in World Music Pedagogy (also known as Cultural Diversity in Music Education) which seeks out means of equitable pedagogy across students regardless of their race, ethnicity, or socioeconomic circumstance. The Mozart effect is particularly controversial as while the initial study suggested listening to Mozart positively impacts spatial-temporal reasoning, later studies either failed to replicate the results, suggested no effect on IQ or spatial ability, or suggested the music of Mozart could be substituted for any music children enjoy in a term called "enjoyment arousal." Another study suggested that even if listening to Mozart may temporarily enhance a student's spatial-temporal abilities, learning to play an instrument is much more likely to improve student performance and achievement. Educators similarly criticized the National Anthem Project not only for promoting the educational use of music as a tool for non-musical goals, but also for its links to nationalism and militarism.

Contemporary music scholars assert that effective music advocacy uses empirically sound arguments that transcend political motivations and personal agendas. Music education philosophers such as Bennett Reimer, Estelle Jorgensen, David J. Elliott, John Paynter, and Keith Swanwick support this view, yet many music teachers and music organizations and schools do not apply this line of reasoning into their music advocacy arguments. Researchers such as Ellen Winner conclude that arts advocates have made bogus claims to the detriment of defending the study of music, her research debunking claims that music education improves math, for example. Researchers Glenn Schellenberg and Eugenia Costa-Giomi also criticize advocates incorrectly associating correlation with causation, Giomi pointing out that while there is a "strong relationship between music participation and academic achievement, the causal nature of the relationship is questionable." Philosophers David Elliott and Marissa Silverman suggest that more effective advocacy involves shying away from "dumbing down" values and aims through slogans and misleading data, energy being better focused into engaging potential supporters in active music-making and musical-affective experiences, these actions recognizing that music and music-making are inherent to human culture and behavior, distinguishing humans from other species. The focus is also on advocacy of music education as important, despite disparities in income and social status. Woodrow Wilson said "We want one class of persons to have a liberal education, and we want another class of persons, a very much larger class of necessity in every society, to forgo the privilege of a liberal education and fit themselves to perform specific difficult manual tasks."

== Cross-cultural ==
The music, languages, and sounds we are exposed to within our own cultures determine our tastes in music and affect the way we perceive the music of other cultures. Many studies have shown distinct differences in the preferences and abilities of musicians from around the world. One study attempted to view the distinctions between the musical preferences of English and Japanese speakers, providing both groups of people with the same series of tones and rhythms. The same type of study was done for English and French speakers. Both studies suggested that the language spoken by the listener determined which groupings of tones and rhythms were more appealing, based on the inflections and natural rhythm groupings of their language.

Another study had Europeans and Africans try to tap along with certain rhythms. European rhythms are regular and built on simple ratios, while African rhythms are typically based on irregular ratios. While both groups of people could perform the rhythms with European qualities, the European group struggled with the African rhythms. This has to do with the ubiquity of complex polyrhythm in African culture and their familiarity with this type of sound.

While each culture has its own musical qualities and appeals, incorporating cross-cultural curricula in our music classrooms can help teach students how to better perceive music from other cultures. Studies show that learning to sing folk songs or popular music of other cultures is an effective way to understand a culture as opposed to merely learning about it. If music classrooms discuss the musical qualities and incorporate styles from other cultures, such as the Brazilian roots of the Bossa Nova, the Afro-Cuban clave, and African drumming, it will expose students to new sounds and teach them how to compare their cultures' music to the different music and start to make them more comfortable with exploring sounds.

Multicultural Education

Music education has expanded to include educational approaches that take into account students' backgrounds. Socioeconomic status, race, gender, and identity play a factor in how a student approaches learning. In multicultural education, educators can adapt their teaching and classroom to include their student's background and culture to create equity in the classroom.

Multicultural education is defined as "a field of study designed to increase educational equity for all students that incorporates, for this purpose, content, concepts, principles, theories, and paradigms." A conceptual model by McKoy, Lind, and Butler addresses the five pillars of content areas that play in multiculturalism. These pillars are student, teacher, content, instruction, and context. Using this model research, educators can cater their classroom to break down barriers and support an equitable learning environment. A multicultural approach to music teaching aims to expand student's knowledge and appreciation of other cultures and world music. This approach also broadens student's understanding of history and geography of other peoples through art forms expressed in different cultures.

Culturally Responsive Teaching

Culturally responsive teaching has roots dating back to the Civil Rights era in the United States, following the Supreme Court case Brown v. Board of Education. It is defined as "a learning theory in which teachers work to adapt and incorporate their students background and culture into the classroom. Following the desegregation of schools in the United States, one of the first theories was developed in the 1960's, theorizing that the success of students of color in academic settings was related to their home culture. They further correlated student's socioeconomic status to academic success, being referred to as "culturally disadvantaged." As music education grew in the U.S. throughout the 70's and 80's, music had expanded outside of the Western world, incorporating world music. In the 80's and 90's, as multicultural music became more prominent in music, educators started to develop culturally responsive pedagogy in response.

There are six features to culturally responsive teaching. These features are: validating, comprehensive, multidimensional, empowering, transformative, and emancipatory. This teaching validates the student's whole culture and self, and contextualizes knowledge, acknowledging various types of learning. Culturally responsive teaching asks educators to see diversity in a positive light and as a resource to creating equitable learning environments. In a recent study, a teacher copied the singing and speaking styles of her student's cultures, as well as their communication styles. It was found that students found this to be meaningful to them. Culturally responsive teaching requires educators to break down the barriers of what is considered acceptable in the classroom, expanding the notion of what is considered acceptable singing and music outside of Eurocentric ideals.

== Role of women ==
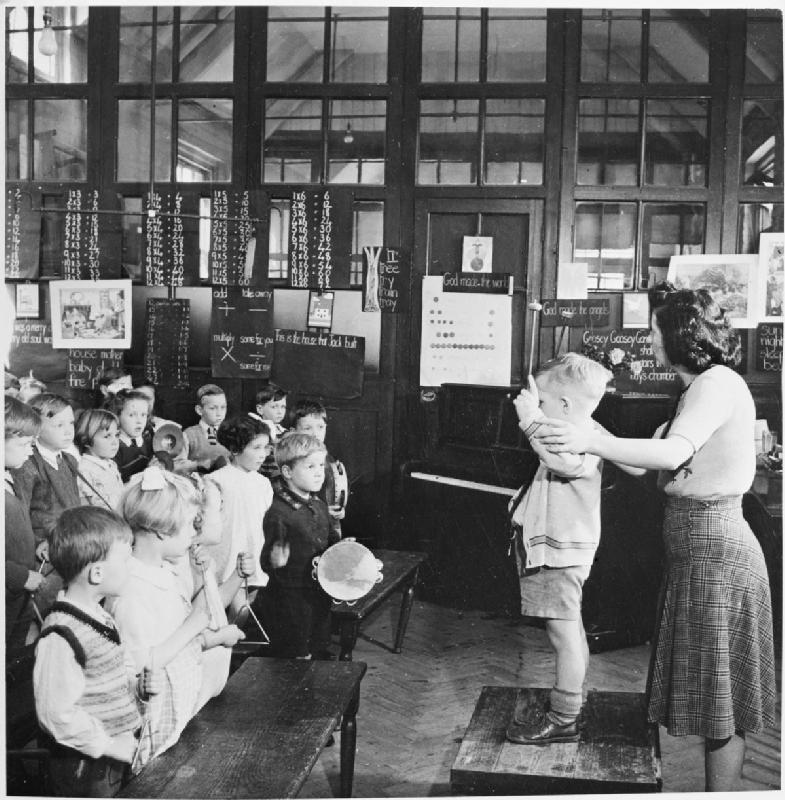
A music teacher leading a music ensemble in an elementary school in 1943.

While music critics argued in the 1880s that "...women [composers] lacked the innate creativity to compose good music" due to "biological predisposition", later, it was accepted that women would have a role in music education, and they became involved in this field "...to such a degree that women dominated music education during the later half of the 19th century and well into the 20th century.""Traditional accounts of the history of music education [in the US] have often neglected the contributions of women, because these texts have emphasized bands and the top leaders in hierarchical music organizations." When looking beyond these bandleaders and top leaders, women had many music education roles in the "...home, community, churches, public schools, and teacher-training institutions" and "...as writers, patrons, and through their volunteer work in organizations."

Despite the limitations imposed on women's roles in music education in the 19th century, women were accepted as kindergarten teachers, because this was deemed to be a "private sphere". Women also taught music privately, in girl's schools, Sunday schools, and they trained musicians in school music programs. By the turn of the 20th century, women began to be employed as music supervisors in elementary schools, teachers in normal schools and professors of music in universities. Women also became more active in professional organizations in music education, and women presented papers at conferences. A woman, Frances Clarke (1860–1958) founded the Music Supervisors National Conference in 1907. While a small number of women served as President of the Music Supervisors National Conference (and the following renamed versions of the organization over the next century) in the early 20th century, there were only two female Presidents between 1952 and 1992, which "[p]ossibly reflects discrimination."

After 1990, however, leadership roles for women in the organization opened up. From 1990 to 2010, there were five female Presidents of this organization. Women music educators "outnumber men two-to-one" in teaching general music, choir, private lessons, and keyboard instruction . More men tend to be hired as for band education, administration and jazz jobs, and more men work in colleges and universities. According to Dr. Sandra Wieland Howe, there is still a "glass ceiling" for women in music education careers, as there is "stigma" associated with women in leadership positions and "men outnumber women as administrators."

== Americas ==
=== Latin American musical traditions ===
==== Historical aspects ====
Among the Aztecs, a great variety of instruments were used for two main purposes: to curate and play - religious music (the purview of specialized priests; and to perform court music - (played daily for the Aztec ruling class.) The education of Aztecs of all social ranks, were conducted in schools called calmecac, telpochcalli, and cuicacalli. and was a requirement for all people. This emphasizes the great importance that music and dance played in the lives of the Aztecs. In Mayan culture, musicians occupied a space between the elite and the common people. Music played a prominent role and professional musicians using a variety of wind instruments, drums and rattles to celebrate military victories. Music also played a prominent role in the funeral rites of the elite.

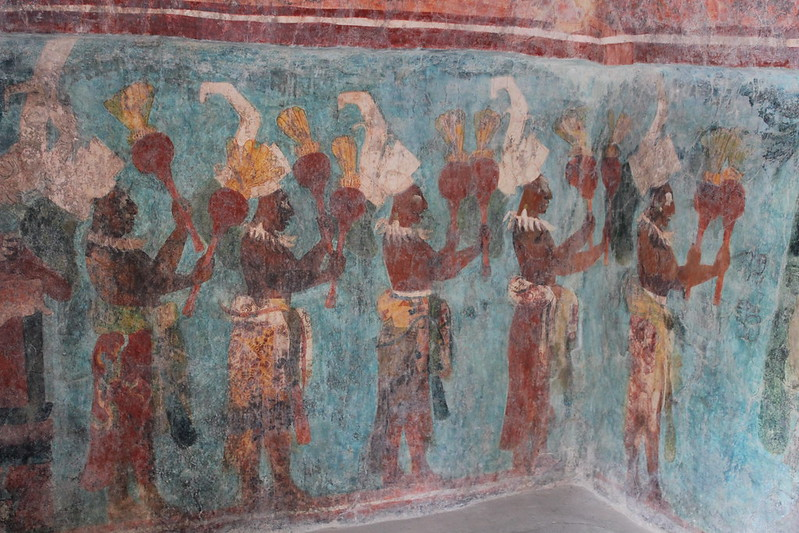
Bonampak, Temple of the Murals, room 1, musicians

With Spanish and Portuguese colonization, music began to be influenced by European ideas and principles.The Catholic Church used music education as a means to spread Christianity to local indigenous populations. One example of an early educator is Esteban Salas considered the first Cuban native-born art music composer developed Santiago de Cuba into a center of music excellence in the country. Salinas' influence in the development of Cuban music includes a collection of over 100 music compositions that established him as the initiator of the Cuban art music tradition. His legacy continues in modern-day Cuba where the Esteban Salas Early Music Festival is held every year in Havana. The festival attracts classical music artists from around the world to perform and teach music following the tradition of Esteban Salinas.

Since music was taught to the general public by rote, until the nineteenth and twentieth centuries, very few people knew how to read music other than those who played instruments. The development of music in Latin America mainly followed that of European development: Choirs were formed to sing masses, chants, psalms; secular music also became more prevalent in the seventeenth and eighteenth centuries and beyond.

==== 20th century ====
In the 20th century, music education in Latin America places a large emphasis on folk music, masses, and orchestral music. Many schools teach their choirs to sing in their native language as well as in English. Several Latin American Schools, specifically in Puerto Rico and Haiti, believe music to be an important subject and are working on expanding their programs. In Puerto Rico, there is no official music education policy governing early childhood music instruction. Outside of school, many communities form their own musical groups and organizations their performances being very popular with the local audiences. There are a few well-known Latin American choral groups, such as "El Coro de Madrigalistas" from Mexico. This famous choral group tours around Mexico, showing students around the country what a professional choral ensemble sounds like. There is also evidence of the positive impact of participation in youth orchestras and academic achievement and resilience in Chile.

Music education can improve academic results in children. In Colombia, the Medellin Music School network has been in operation for over two decades. It has been demonstrated that students involved in this music program have better academic achievement and are less inclined to participate in violence. The music program increases chances of graduation for participants.

==== Indigenous cultures ====
Beyond traditional choral music, young Latin American artists are now using hip-hop as a way to promote the revitalization of indigenous languages and celebrate traditions that originated before the Spanish Conquest. Hip-hop in Latin America now acts as a voice of the oppressed, establishing this form of music as an expression of social revolution. Throughout Latin America, young indigenous artists are now using hip hop as a way to express their struggle against poverty and injustice. The new music coming out of Latin America all shows influences that go back to ancient Indigenous traditions. Uchpa and Alborada are two successful Peruvian bands who have celebrated their indigenous roots. From Chile, Jaas Newen's song "Inche Kay Che" calls for the defense of traditional Indigenous culture. The song "Koangagu" by Brazilian group Brô MC's examines how Indigenous and modern Brazilian cultures can come together in music. "Presente y Combativo" by Parce MC, Mugre Sur, Sapín celebrates the life of a Bolivian rapper who was murdered in 2009.

=== United States ===
==== 18th century ====
After the preaching of Reverend Thomas Symmes, the first singing school was created in 1717 in Boston for the purposes of improving singing and music reading in the church. These singing schools gradually spread throughout the colonies. Music education continued to flourish with the creation of the Academy of Music in Boston. Reverend John Tufts published An Introduction to the Singing of Psalm Tunes Using Non-Traditional Notation which is regarded as the first music textbook in the colonies. Between 1700 and 1820, more than 375 tune books would be published by such authors as Samuel Holyoke, Francis Hopkinson, William Billings, and Oliver Holden.

Music began to spread as a curricular subject into other school districts. Soon after music expanded to all grade levels and the teaching of music reading was improved until the music curriculum grew to include several activities in addition to music reading. By the end of 1864 public school music had spread throughout the country.

==== 19th century ====
In 1832, Lowell Mason and George Webb formed the Boston Academy of Music with the purposes of teaching singing and theory as well as methods of teaching music. Mason published his Manuel of Instruction in 1834 which was based upon the music education works of Pestalozzian System of Education founded by Swiss educator Johann Heinrich Pestalozzi. This handbook gradually became used by many singing school teachers. From 1837 to 1838, the Boston School Committee allowed Lowell Mason to teach music in the Hawes School as a demonstration. This is regarded as the first time music education was introduced to public schools in the United States. In 1838 the Boston School Committee approved the inclusion of music in the curriculum and Lowell Mason became the first recognized supervisor of elementary music. In later years Luther Whiting Mason became the Supervisor of Music in Boston and spread music education into all levels of public education (grammar, primary, and high school).

During the middle of the 19th century, Boston became the model to which many other cities across the United States included and shaped their public school music education programs. Music methodology for teachers as a course was first introduced in the Normal School in Potsdam. The concept of classroom teachers in a school that taught music under the direction of a music supervisor was the standard model for public school music education during this century. (See also: Music education in the United States) While women were discouraged from composing in the 19th century, "later, it was accepted that women would have a role in music education, and they became involved in this field...to such a degree that women dominated music education during the later half of the 19th century and well into the 20th century."

==== Early 20th century ====
In the United States, teaching colleges with four-year degree programs developed from the Normal Schools and included music. Oberlin Conservatory first offered the Bachelor of Music Education degree. Osbourne G. McCarthy, an American music educator, introduced details for studying music for credit in Chelsea High School. Notable events in the history of music education in the early 20th century also include:

- Founding of the Music Supervisor's National Conference (changed to Music Educators National Conference in 1934, later MENC: The National Association for Music Education in 1998, and currently The National Association for Music Education – NAfME) in Keokuk, Iowa in 1907.
- Rise of the school band and orchestra movement leading to performance oriented school music programs.
- Growth in music methods publications.
- Frances Elliot Clark develops and promotes phonograph record libraries for school use.
- Carl Seashore and his Measures of Musical Talent music aptitude test starts testing people in music.

==== Middle 20th century to 21st century ====
The following table illustrates some notable developments from this period:

Date	Major event	Historical importance for music education
1950	The Child's Bill of Rights in Music	A student-centered philosophy was formally espoused by MENC.
1953	The American School Band Directors Association formed	The band movement becomes organized.
1957	Launch of Sputnik	Increased curricular focus on science, math, technology with less emphasis on music education.
1959	Contemporary Music Project	The purpose of the project was to make contemporary music relevant in children by placing quality composers and performers in the learning environment. Leads to the Comprehensive Musicianship movement.
1961	American Choral Directors Association formed	The choral movement becomes organized.
1963	Yale Seminar	Federally supported development of arts education focusing on quality music classroom literature. Juilliard Project leads to the compilation and publication of musical works from major historical eras for elementary and secondary schools.
1965	National Endowment for the Arts	Federal financial support and recognition of the value music has in society.
1967	Tanglewood Symposium	Establishment of a unified and eclectic philosophy of music education. Specific emphasis on youth music, special education music, urban music, and electronic music.
1969	GO Project	35 Objectives listed by MENC for quality music education programs in public schools. Published and recommended for music educators to follow.
1978	The Ann Arbor Symposium	Emphasized the impact of learning theory in music education in the areas of: auditory perception, motor learning, child development, cognitive skills, memory processing, affect, and motivation.
1984	Becoming Human Through Music symposium	"The Wesleyan Symposium on the Perspectives of Social Anthropology in the Teaching and Learning of Music" (Middletown, Connecticut, August 6–10, 1984). Emphasized the importance of cultural context in music education and the cultural implications of rapidly changing demographics in the United States.
1990	Multicultural Symposium in Music Education	Growing out of the awareness of the increasing diversity of the American School population, the three-day Symposium for music teachers was co-sponsored by MENC, the Society for Ethnomusicology, and the Smithsonian Institution, in order to provide models, materials, and methods for teaching music of the world's cultures to school children and youth.
1994	National Standards for Music Education	For much of the 1980s, there was a call for educational reform and accountability in all curricular subjects. This led to the National Standards for Music Education introduced by MENC. The MENC standards were adopted by some states, while other states have produced their own standards or largely eschewed the standards movement.
1999	The Housewright Symposium / Vision 2020	Examined changing philosophies and practices and predicted how American music education will (or should) look in the year 2020.
2007	Tanglewood II: Charting the Future	Reflected on the 40 years of change in music education since the first Tanglewood Symposium of 1967, developing a declaration regarding priorities for the next forty years.
2014	Revised National Standards for Music Education	The National Standards created in 1994 were revised with an emphasis on musical literacy. Instead of the 9 content standards, there are 4 artistic processes (Create, Perform, Respond and Connect) with 2–3 anchor standards per process.

==== Present ====
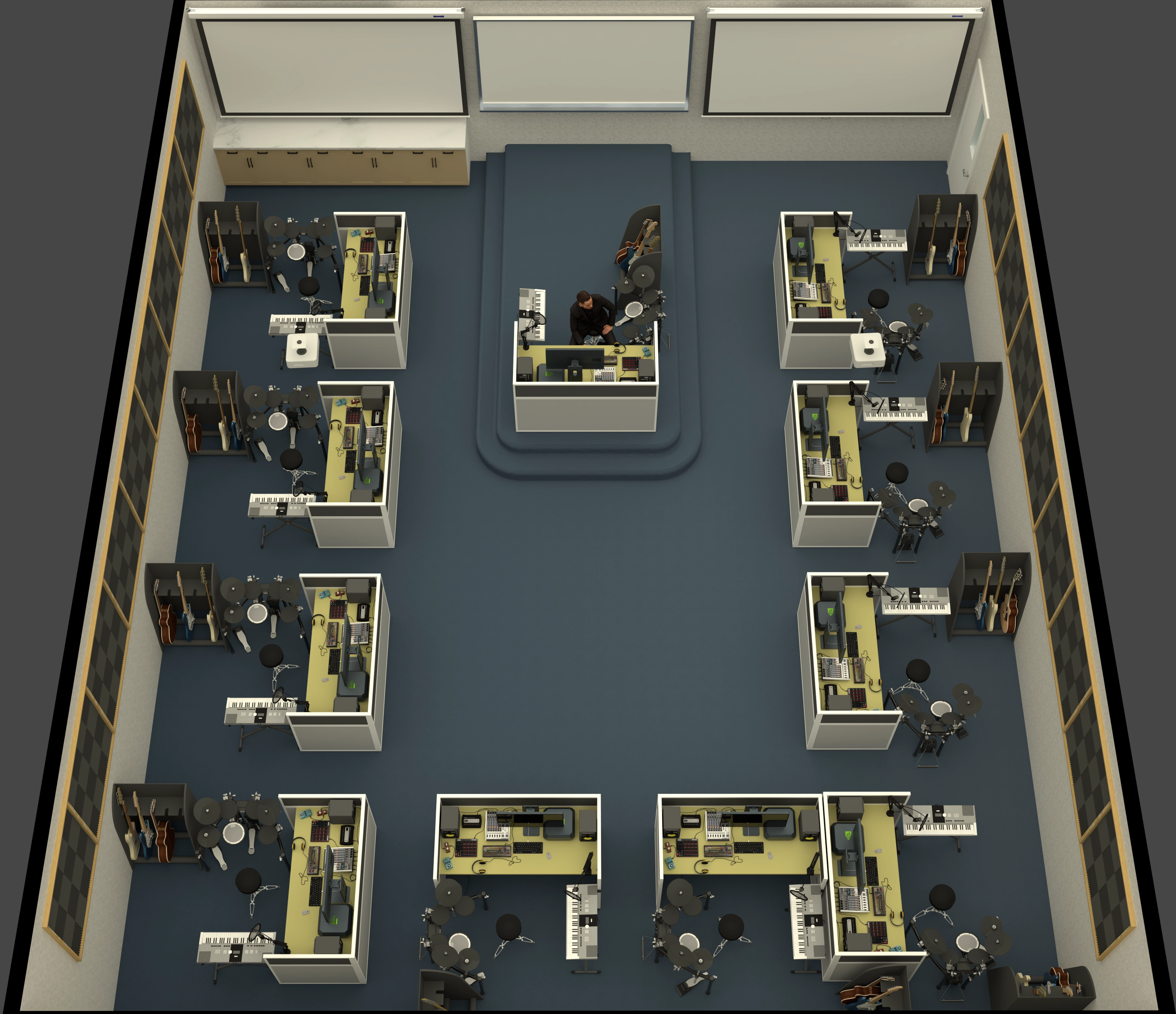
3D model of a digital audio workstation classroom

Music course offerings and even entire degree programs in online music education developed in the first decade of the 21st century at various institutions, and the fields of world music pedagogy and popular music pedagogy have also seen notable expansion.

In the late 20th and early 21st centuries, social aspects of teaching and learning music came to the fore. This emerged as praxial music education, critical theory, and feminist theory. Of importance are the colloquia and journals of the MayDay Group, "an international think tank of music educators that aims to identify, critique, and change taken-for-granted patterns of professional activity, polemical approaches to method and philosophy, and educational politics and public pressures that threaten effective practice and critical communication in music education." With a new focus on social aspects of music education, scholars have analyzed critical aspects such as music and race, gender, class, institutional belonging, and sustainability.

== Europe ==
Music has been a prominent subject in schools and other learning institutions in Europe for many centuries. Such early institutions as the Sistine Chapel Choir and the Vienna Boys Choir offered important early models of choral learning, while the Paris Conservatoire later became influential for training in wind band instruments. Several instructional methods were developed in Europe that would later impact other parts of the world, including those affiliated with Zoltan Kodaly, Carl Orff, Émile Jaques-Dalcroze, and ABRSM, to name but a few. Notable professional organizations on the continent now include the Europe regional branch of the International Society for Music Education, and the European Association of Conservatoires. In recent decades, Central, Southern, and Eastern Europe have tended to successfully emphasize classical music heritage, while the Nordic countries have especially promoted popular music in schools.

== Asia ==
=== India ===
Institutional music education was started in colonial India by Rabindranath Tagore after he founded the Visva-Bharati University. At present, most universities have a faculty of music with some universities specially dedicated to fine arts such as Indira Kala Sangeet University, Swathi Thirunal College of Music, Prayag Sangeet Samiti or Rabindra Bharati University.Indian classical music is based on the Guru-Shishya parampara system. The teacher, known as Guru, transmit the musical knowledge to the student, or shishya. This is still the main system used in India to transmit musical knowledge. Although European art music became popularized in schools throughout much of the world during the twentieth century (East Asia, Latin America, Oceania, Africa), India remains one of the few highly populated nations in which non-European indigenous music traditions have consistently received relatively greater emphasis. That said, there is certainly much western influence in the popular music associated with Bollywood film scores.

=== Indonesia ===
The Indonesian island of Java is known for its rich musical culture, centered around gamelan music. The two oldest gamelan instrument sets, dating from the twelfth century, are housed in the kratons (palaces) in the cities of Yogyakarta and Surakarta. Gamelan music is an integral part of the Javanese culture: it is a part of religious ceremonies, weddings, funerals, palace activities, national holidays, and local community gatherings. In recent years, there has been an increasing market for gamelan associated tourism: several companies arrange visits for tourists wishing to participate in and learn gamelan.

Gamelan music has a distinct pedagogical approach. The term maguru panggul, translated means "teaching with the mallet" describes the master-apprentice approach that is used most often when teaching the music. The teacher demonstrates long passages of music at a time, without stopping to have the student demonstrate comprehension of the passage, as in a western music pedagogy. A teacher and student will frequently sit on opposite sides of a drum or mallet instrument, so that both can play it. This provides the teacher an easy way to demonstrate, and the student can study and mimic the teacher's actions. The teacher trains the kendang player, who is the leader of the ensemble. The teacher works one on one with them and repeats the parts as many times as necessary until the piece is rhythmically and stylistically accurate. The Kendang player is sometimes relied on to transmit the music to their fellow gamelan members.

== Africa ==
The South African Department of Education and the ILAM Music Heritage Project SA teach African music using western musical framework. ILAM's Listen and Learn for students 11–14 is "unique" in teaching curriculum requirements for western music using recordings of traditional African music.

From the time that Africa was colonized up to 1994, indigenous music and arts being taught in schools was a rare occurrence. The African National Congress (ANC) attempted to repair the neglect of indigenous knowledge and the overwhelming emphasis on written musical literacy in schools. It is not well known that the learning of indigenous music actually has a philosophy and teaching procedure that is different from western "formal" training. It involves the whole community because indigenous songs are about the history of its people. After the colonization of Africa, music became more centered on Christian beliefs and European folk songs, rather than the more improvised and fluid indigenous music. Before the major changes education went through from 1994 to 2004, during the first decade of the democratic government, teachers were trained as classroom teachers and told that they would have to incorporate music into other subject areas. The few colleges with teaching programs that included instrumental programs held a greater emphasis on music theory, history of western music, western music notation, and less on making music. Up until 1999, most college syllabi did not include training in indigenous South African Music.

In African cultures, music is seen as a community experience and is used for social and religious occasions. As soon as children show some sign of being able to handle music or a musical instrument they are allowed to participate with the adults of the community in musical events. Traditional songs are more important to many people because they are stories about the histories of the indigenous peoples.

== Australia ==
Although the National Curriculum for schools includes music under its Arts component, research published in 2005 and 2020 have shown that it varies widely from state to state and school to school, with some students receiving none at all. By state and territory: Queensland's state primary schools has enjoyed good music programs since the 1980s; South Australia's music education strategy and fund was formed in 2019; Victoria has a best practice framework; Tasmania, Western Australia, and the ACT employs specialist teachers in some primary schools; in New South Wales, generalist teachers are responsible for teaching the whole primary school curriculum in state schools.

In November 2018, ABC Television aired Don't Stop The Music, a three-part series which documented the launch and progress of a music program in a primary school in an underprivileged area of Perth, Western Australia. It showed the positive effects of the program on the students and their families, as well as the teachers. A broader project encouraged members of the public to donate musical instruments to disadvantaged schools, which led to Musica Viva Australia receiving over 4,500 instruments to process. The series featured popular musician Guy Sebastian and researcher and music educator Anita Collins, and was also supported by the Salvation Army.

== Notable music educators ==
- José Antonio Abreu
- Jamey Aebersold
- Stefan Ammer
- Ysaye Barnwell
- Jack Beeson
- Leonard Bernstein
- Edward Bailey Birge
- Nadia Boulanger
- Allen Britton
- Patricia Shehan Campbell
- F. Melius Christiansen
- Frances Elliott Clark
- Satis N. Coleman
- Julia Crane
- John Curwen
- Max Deutsch
- Peter W. Dykema
- Will Earhart
- Jacob Eisenberg
- David J. Elliott
- Eric Gilder
- Sarah Ann Glover
- Edwin Gordon
- Lucy Green
- Philip C. Hayden
- David G. Hebert
- Paul Hindemith
- Jere T. Humphreys
- Émile Jaques-Dalcroze
- Dmitry Kabalevsky
- Zoltán Kodály
- Paul R. Lehman
- Charles Leonhard
- Joseph E. Maddy
- Michael Mark
- Ellis Marsalis, Jr.
- Wynton Marsalis
- Lowell Mason
- Luther Whiting Mason
- Jacques-Louis Monod
- James Mursell
- Carl Orff
- John Paynter
- Bennett Reimer
- R. Murray Schafer
- Christopher Small
- Charles Villiers Stanford
- Shinichi Suzuki
- Lennie Tristano
- John Tufts
- Thomas Tyra
- Heitor Villa-Lobos

== Professional organizations ==
- American Choral Directors Association
- American Orff-Schulwerk Association
- American String Teachers Association
- International Association for Jazz Education
- International Society for Music Education
- International Society for Philosophy of Music Education
- National Association for Music Education (US-based: also called NafME, and previously MENC)
- Music Teachers National Association
- Nordic Network for Music Education (NNME)

== See also ==
- Basic Concepts in Music Education
- Colored music notation
- Comparison of music education software
- List of music students by teacher
- Musical Futures
- Music education for young children
- Music school
- Musicology
- Research in Music Education
- Timeline of jazz education
- Visual arts education
- Vocal coach
- Voice teacher
- El Sistema

== Bibliography ==
- Anderson, William M. and Patricia Shehan Campbell, eds. Multicultural Perspectives in Music Education. Reston, VA: Music Educators National Conference, 1989.
- Campbell, Patricia Shehan. Teaching Music Globally. New York: Oxford University Press, 2004.
- DeBakey, Michael E., MD. Leading Heart Surgeon, Baylor College of Music.
- Kertz-Welzel, Alexandra. "The Singing Muse: Three Centuries of Music Education in Germany." Journal of Historical Research in Music Education XXVI no. 1 (2004): 8-27.
- Kertz-Welzel, Alexandra. "Didaktik of Music: A German Concept and its Comparison to American Music Pedagogy." International Journal of Music Education (Practice) 22 No. 3 (2004): 277–286.
- Kertz-Welzel, Alexandra. Every Child for Music: Musikpädagogik und Musikunterricht in den USA. Musikwissenschaft/Musikpädagogik in der Blauen Eule, no. 74. Essen, Germany: Verlag Die Blaue Eule, 2006. ISBN 3-89924-169-X.
- Machover, Tod, "My Cello" in Turkle, Sherry (editor), Evocative objects : things we think with, Cambridge, Mass. : MIT Press, 2007. ISBN 978-0-262-20168-1
- Pete Moser and George McKay, eds. (2005) Community Music: A Handbook. Russell House Publishing. ISBN 1-903855-70-5.
- National Standards for Arts Education. Reston, VA: Music Educators National Conference (MENC), 1994. ISBN 1-56545-036-1.
- Neurological Research, Vol. 19, February 1997.
- Ratey, John J., MD. A User's Guide to the Brain. New York: Pantheon Books, 2001.
- Rauscher, F.H., et al. "Music and Spatial Task Performance: A Causal Relationship," University of California, Irvine, 1994.
- Seashore, Carl, "The Measurement of Musical Talent", New York, G. Schirmer, 1915
- Seashore, Carl, "The Psychology of Musical Talent", Boston, New York [etc.] Silver, Burdett and Company, 1919
- Seashore, Carl, "Approaches to the Science of Music and Speech", Iowa City, The University, 1933
- Seashore, Carl, "Psychology of Music", New York, London, McGraw-Hill Book Company, Inc., 1938
- Schippers, Huib. Facing the Music. New York: Oxford University Press, 2010.
- Sorce Keller, Marcello (1984). "Music in Higher Education in Italy and in the United States: the Pros and Cons of Tradition and Innovation". Symposium. XXIV: 140–147.
- Sorce Keller, Marcello (1987). "Music Education in Italy: Something New on the Western Front". International Journal of Music Education. 10: 17–19. doi:10.1177/025576148701000103. S2CID 144087060.
- Sorin-Avram, Vîrtop (2015). "The Musical Education: From Testing the Ground to General Culture Acquisition". Procedia - Social and Behavioral Sciences. 191: 2500–4. doi:10.1016/j.sbspro.2015.04.443.
- Weinberger, Norm. "The Impact of Arts on Learning." MuSICa Research Notes 7, no. 2 (Spring 200).

== Correlated arguments ==
- music
- Pedagogy of Music
