= Paul R. Lehman =

American music educator

Paul R. Lehman is an American music educator.

As a result of his commitment to both music and education he has devoted his career to promoting music and the other arts as essential disciplines in the elementary and secondary schools of the United States. He served as president of the Music Educators National Conference (now the National Association for Music Education) from 1984 to 1986, which was a particularly challenging period for arts education because of the emphasis on ”back to basics” that resulted from the landmark report, ”A Nation at Risk”, published in 1983 by the National Commission on Excellence in Education. Through his speeches, writings, and other advocacy efforts for more than fifty years he has contributed in important ways to the continuing effort to ensure that the arts remain a part of the education of every child in America.

== Early life ==
Paul Robert Lehman was born on April 20, 1931, in Athens, Ohio. His father, Harvey Christian Lehman, was a Professor of Psychology at Ohio University in Athens. His mother, Vera Marjorie Simmons Lehman, died of breast cancer as Paul was about to enter grade three. On June 28, 1953, he married Virginia Ruth Wickline, whom he had known since their days together in high school band. They have two children, David Alan (1963—) and Laura Ann (1965—).

== Education ==
Lehman received his high school diploma from Athens (Ohio) High School in 1949. He enrolled at Ohio University as a major in music education and received his B.Sc. degree in 1953. Following two years of service in the U.S. Air Force, he began graduate work at the University of Michigan, where he received his M.Mus. degree in Wind Instruments in 1959 and his Ph.D. in Music Education in 1962. His principal mentors were his high school band director, William C. Fingerhut, and his professors at the University of Michigan, William D. Revelli, Allen Britton, and Marguerite Hood.

== Work experience ==
He taught instrumental and vocal music in the schools of Jackson Township, Stark County, Ohio. Following his graduate work, he received appointments as instructor (later Assistant Professor) at the University of Colorado (1962-1965), as Associate Professor (later Professor) at the University of Kentucky (1965-1970), and as Professor at the Eastman School of Music (1970-1975). While on leave from the University of Kentucky in 1967-68 he served as Music Specialist in the U.S. Office of Education (now Department of Education) in Washington, D.C. Returning to the University of Michigan as a Professor in 1975, he became Associate Dean of the School of Music in 1977 and was appointed to the newly created position of Senior Associate Dean in 1989.

He served as Project Director for Phase 2 of the Goals and Objectives Project (GO Project) of the Music Educators National Conference (MENC) in 1970, and he was chair of the MENC National Commission on Instruction, which developed the pioneering publication The School Music Program: Description and Standards in 1974. He served as Project Director for the three sessions of the National Symposium on the Applications of Psychology to the Teaching and Learning of Music (The Ann Arbor Symposium) in 1978, 1979, and 1982. He served as the initial Chief Reader for the Advanced Placement Examination in Music (AP Music Theory) of the College Board (1969–75), as a consultant in the music assessments of the National Assessment of Educational Progress (1970–74, 1995–98), and as a member of the committee to revise the Music Education Test of the National Teacher Examination of the Educational Testing Service (1973–75, 1978, 1989–94). He also performed as a bassoonist with various orchestras.

He was chair of the music task force that wrote the national voluntary standards for K-12 music (1992–94), Opportunity To Learn Standards for Music Instruction (1992–94), and National Performance Standards for Music (1994–96). He is the author of more than 200 articles and other publications, and he has delivered more than 300 lectures on education in nearly every state of the USA and more than a dozen other countries. Since his retirement in 1996 he has taught a variety of continuing education courses in music.

== Honors and awards ==
Honorary Life Member of the International Society for Music Education

Member of the Music Educators Hall of Fame

Distinguished Service Award, Music Industry Conference

National Citation, Phi Mu Alpha Sinfonia fraternity

Citation, National Federation of Music Clubs

Citation, Foundation for the Advancement of Education in Music

Lowell Mason Fellow, Music Educators National Conference

The National Symposium “Aiming for Excellence: The Impact of the Standards Movement on Music Education,” cosponsored by the University of Michigan School of Music and the Music Educators National Conference, was dedicated to him on the occasion of his retirement from the University of Michigan School of Music

== Selected publications ==
"Reforming Education Reform," Music Educators Journal, 101, 3 (March 2015), 22-32.

"How Are We Doing?" Music Assessment and Global Diversity: Practice, Measurement and Policy (Selected Papers from the Fourth International Symposium on Assessment in Music Education). Ed. by Timothy S. Brophy, Mei-Ling Lai, and Hsiao-Fen Chen. Chicago: GIA Publications, Inc., 2014, pp. 3–17.

"Getting Down to Basics," Assessment in Music Education: Integrating Curriculum, Theory, and Practice (Proceedings of the 2007 Florida Symposium on Assessment in Music Education). Ed. by Timothy S. Brophy. Chicago: GIA Publications, Inc., 2008 (pp. 17–27).

"Advocacy for Music Education: Ten Tips To Protect and Strengthen Your Music Program," International Journal of Music Education, 23, 2 (August 2005), 175-178.

"A Personal Perspective" (in the Grand Masters Series), Music Educators Journal, 88, 5 (March 2002), 47-51.

"Stability and Change in the Role of the Musician," The Musician's Role: New Challenges (The ISME Commission for the Education of the Professional Musician, 1996 Seminar). Ed. by Giacomo M. Oliva, Malmö, Sweden: Malmö Academy of Music [2000], pp. 29–34.

"The Power of the National Standards for Music Education," Performing with Understanding: The Challenge of the National Standards for Music Education. Ed. by Bennett Reimer. Reston, VA: Music Educators National Conference, 2000, pp. 3–9.

"The Status of Music Education in the United States," Report of the International Forum of Music Education in Okayama 1997. Ed. by Yasuharu Takahagi and Tsuneo Nakajima. Tokyo: Foundation for the Promotion of Music Education and Culture, 1998, pp. 27–35.

Performance Standards for Music: Strategies and Benchmarks for Assessing Progress Toward the National Standards, Grades PreK-12. Reston, VA: Music Educators National Conference, 1996. (Chair, MENC Committee on Performance Standards)

"Control of K-12 Arts Education: Who Sets the Curriculum?," Arts Education Policy Review, 97, 2 (November/December 1995), 16-20.

"The National Standards for Music Education: Meeting the Challenge," The Quarterly VI, 2 (Summer 1995), 5-13.

National Standards for Arts Education. Reston, VA: Music Educators National Conference, 1994. (Chair, Music Task Force)

The School Music Program: A New Vision. Reston, VA: Music Educators National Conference, 1994. (Chair, MENC Task Force for National Standards in the Arts)

Opportunity-To-Learn Standards for PreK-12 Instruction in Music. Reston, VA: Music Educators National Conference, 1994. (Project Director)

"Why Your School Needs Music," Arts Education Policy Review, 94, 4 (March/April, 1993), 30-34.

"Curriculum and Program Evaluation," Handbook of Research on Music Teaching and Learning (Chapter 18). New York: Schirmer Books, 1992, pp. 281–294.

"Winning and Losing in the Struggle To Reform Education," Design for Arts in Education, 93, 5 (May/June 1992), 2-11.

"What Students Should Learn in the Arts," Content of the Curriculum: 1988 ASCD Yearbook. Ed. by Ronald S. Brandt. Alexandria, VA: Association for Supervision and Curriculum Development, 1988, pp. 109–131.

"A Music Education View of the World," International Music Education--ISME Yearbook Vol. XV, 1988: A World View of Music Education. Ed. by Jack Dobbs. Canberra, Australia: [np] 1988, pp. 24–32. (Papers from the XVIII Conference of the International Society for Music Education, Canberra, Australia, 1988)

Music in Today's Schools: Rationale and Commentary. Reston, VA: Music Educators National Conference, 1987.

Who Cares About Quality in Education?, Reston, VA: Music Educators National Conference, 1986.

"Quality versus Superficiality in Arts Education," Design for Arts in Education, 86, 5 (May/June 1985), 8-9.

"Excellence in Arts Education: Does the Nation Really Want It?," Design for Arts In Education, 85, 2 (November/December 1983), 40-42.

The School Music Program: Description and Standards. Vienna, VA: Music Educators National Conference, 1974. (Chair, National Commission on Instruction)
