= Music-learning theory =

The field of music education contains a number of learning theories that specify how students learn music based on behavioral and cognitive psychology.

== Classical learning theory ==
While formal music education has roots going at least as far back as the Hebrews in Egypt or the ancient Greeks, challenges arose as music became more specialized and technically complex after the 5th century BCE in Ancient Greece and as the development of notation shifted music education from training in singing to training in music reading. Educators and theorists such as Odo of Cluny and Guido d'Arezzo in the 10th and 11th centuries explored methods to teach these new developing notational practices. Academic interest in music education lessened by the Renaissance as universities abandoned music as a part of their curriculum in the mid 16th century, while the Protestant Reformation later brought some changes to music education, Martin Luther among other individuals suggesting that music, poetry, and history be added to standard education curriculum. In the 17th century, John Amos Comenius recommended music education for religious purposes and designed a methodology to do so, as Richard Mulcaster encouraged universal education including singing and playing as standard curriculum. By the 19th century the conservatory model became more common outside of Italy alongside a number of choir schools which provided education as well as practical music experience.

== 20th century ==
Mainstream pedagogy and examination of how students learn theory rose to prominence in the 20th century by theorists and educators beginning with Émile Jaques-Dalcroze, Zoltán Kodály, and Carl Orff, and followed by Shinichi Suzuki, Edwin Gordon, and Valeri Brainin among others. Later research into educational learning theories in the 1960s places emphasis on behavioral, cognitive, and constructivist thinking. The Tanglewood Symposium of 1967 and the Music Educators National Conference Goals and Objective Project in 1969 were other early examples of the growing movement of applying modern developments in sequencing curriculum.

=== Behavioral learning theories and music education ===
Behaviorism examines relationships between the environment and the individual with roots in early 20th century work in the German experimental school. Theories by researchers such as Ivan Pavlov (who introduced classical conditioning), and B.F. Skinner (operant conditioning) looked at how environmental stimulation could impact learning, theorists building on these concepts to make applications to music learning. The research of Clifford Madsen, Robert Duke, Harry Price, and Cornelia Yarbrough build on the operant conditioning model focusing on guiding "good" or "successful" teaching by analyzing the role of appropriate reinforcement such as praise and feedback on musical discrimination, attitude, and performance. Later studies also examined music itself as a mechanism of reinforcement, such as research by Greer (1981) and Madsen (1981).

=== Cognitive learning theories and music education ===
Cognitive theories of learning, often viewed as the antithesis of behavioral theories, attempt to map how individual learning processes relate to already-familiar knowledge. Gestalt psychology serves as the foundation for many applications to music learning theory.

Fred Lerdahl and Ray Jackendoff (1983) theorized on musical grammar based on Chomsky's linguistic theories, arguing that "acoustic information triggers mental operations that impose order onto input. If there is sufficient exposure to music, musical understanding will occur through enculturation rather than formal training."

Other cognitive learning theories are also based on research in early childhood education, motor learning, hemispheric dominance, and information theory.

=== Constructivist learning theories and music education ===
Constructivist theories of learning, largely developed by Jean Piaget, accept the relation between the individual and the environment as crucial for understanding the process of learning in a more holistic perspective than cognitive and behavioral models. Kurt Lewin, also considered the 'father' of social psychology, used Gestalt theory to develop his field theory of learning, a model that emphasizes "context familiarity as an important descriptor of how individuals learn and process information."

Modern constructivist applications to music education include research by Roger A. Rideout, Stephen P. Paul, Geraint Wiggins and others.

== Sound before sight ==
Contemporary music pedagogies emphasize sound before sight, or the idea that in order to develop an understanding of music and music notation, individuals must first become comfortable with listening to, singing, and performing tonal and rhythm patterns before reading and writing music. Modern studies by Luce (1965), McPherson (1993, 1995, 2005), and Bernhard (2004) all suggest a significant positive correlation with playing by ear and the ability to sight read, and experimental research by Haston (2004) and Musco (2006) also suggest that spending classroom time playing by ear does not negatively impact students' abilities to develop music reading skills.
