= Edward Birge =

Edward Birge may refer to:

- Edward Asahel Birge (1851–1950), professor and administrator at the University of Wisconsin–Madison
- Edward Bailey Birge (1868–1952), founding member of the Music Supervisors National Conference
