= Robert Duke =

Robert Duke may refer to:

- Robert Duke, songwriter alias used by Joe Meek (1929–1967), English record producer, sound engineer and songwriter
- Duke Osborn (Robert Duke Osborn, 1897–1976), American football player
- Robert Rippon Duke (1817–1909), English architect and surveyor
- Robert Duke (music scholar), American music scholar
