= Positive organ =

Small pipe organ

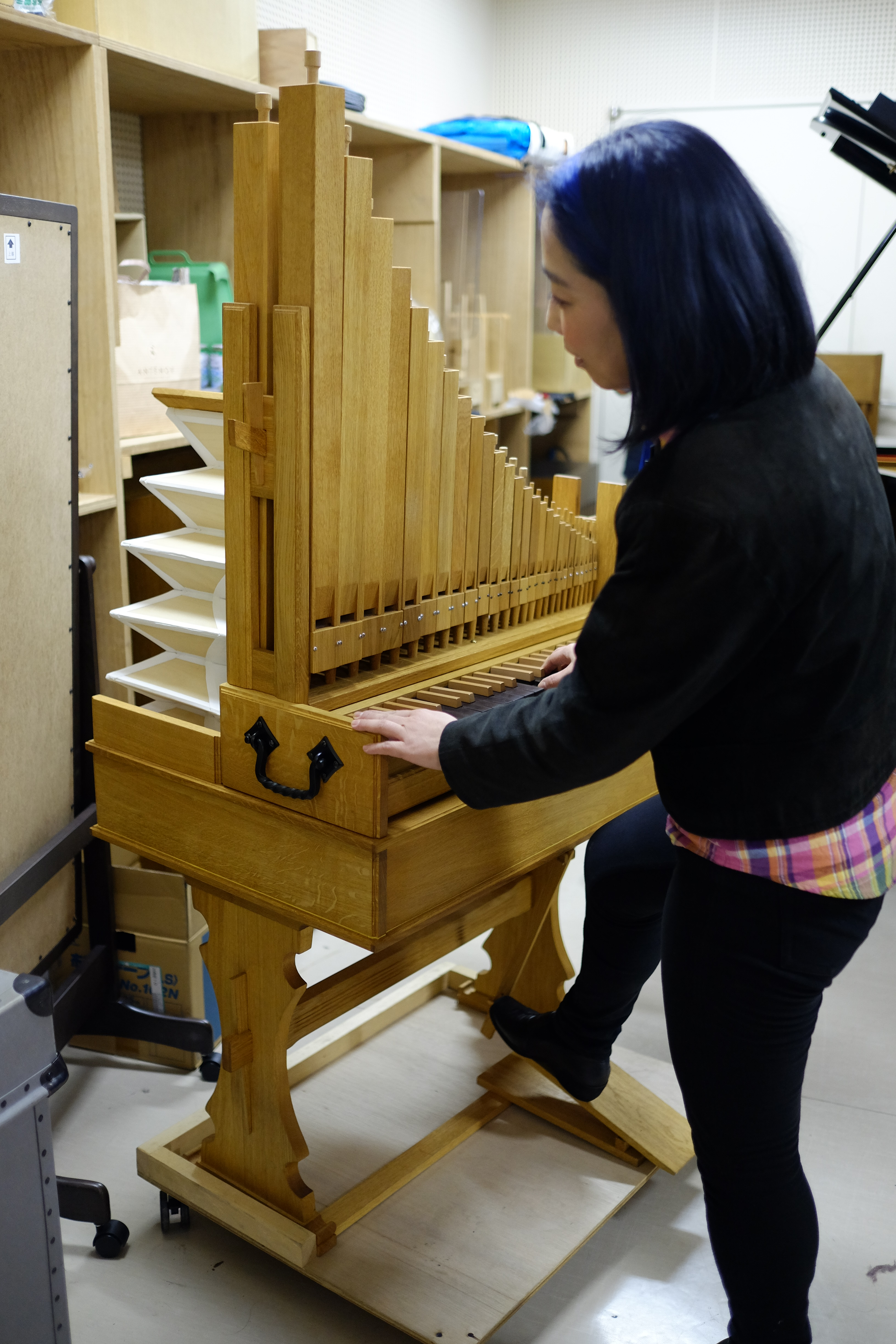
Laukhuff positive organ in Yokohama Minato Mirai Hall (ja), Japan, 2011, with portative-like pipe and bellows arrangement. On the portative, however, the bellows were operated directly by one of the player's hands.

A positive organ (also positiv organ, positif organ, portable organ, chair organ, or simply positive, positiv, positif, or chair) (from the Latin verb ponere, "to place") is a small, usually one-manual, pipe organ that is built to be more or less mobile. It was common in sacred and secular music between the 10th and the 18th centuries, in chapels and small churches, as a chamber organ and for the basso continuo in ensemble works. The smallest common kind of positive, hardly higher than the keyboard, is called chest or box organ and is especially popular for basso continuo work; positives for more independent use tend to be higher.

From the Middle Ages through Renaissance and Baroque the instrument came in many different forms, including processional and tabletop organs that have profited relatively less from the renewed popularity the type in general has enjoyed from the Orgelbewegung onwards.

== History ==
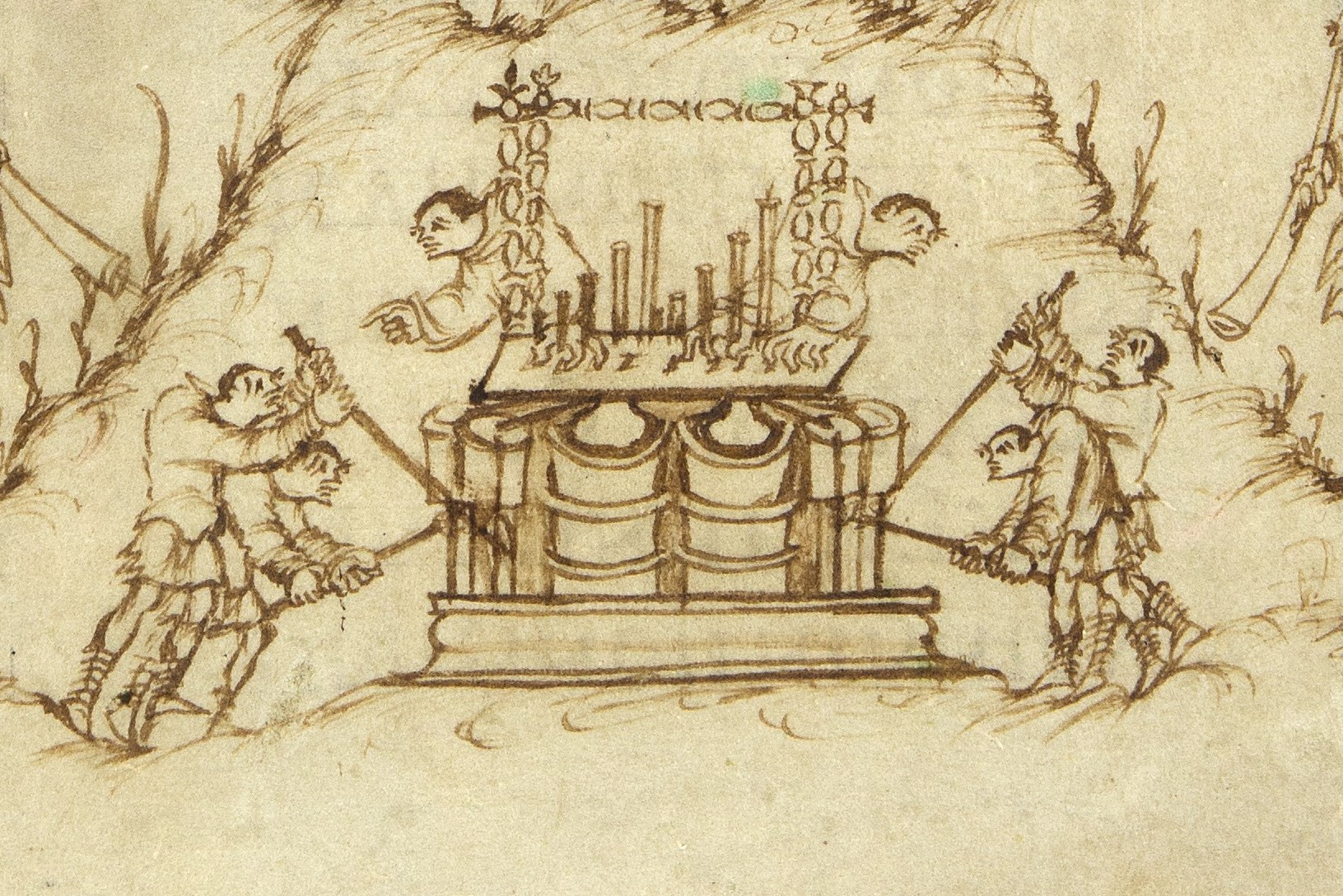
Organ from the Utrecht Psalter, circa 850 a.d.

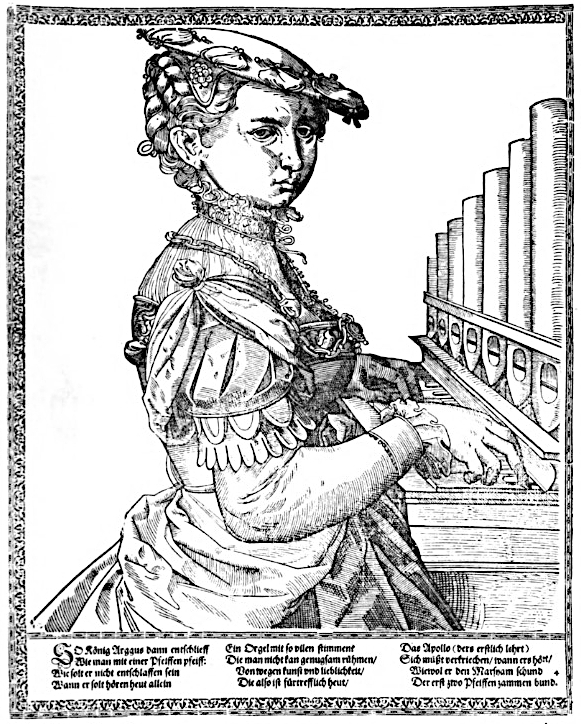
Positive organ, from a German print, circa 1575.

A well-known instance of an early positive or portable organ of the 4th century occurs on the obelisk erected to the memory of Theodosius I on his death in AD 395. Among the illuminated manuscripts of the British Museum there are many miniatures representing interesting varieties of the portable organ of the Middle Ages, including Add. MS. 29902 (fol. 6), Add. MS. 27695b (fol. 13), and Cotton MS. Tiberius A VII. fol. 104d., all of the 14th century, and Add. MS. 28962 and Add. MS. 17280, both of the 15th century.

In the Renaissance and Baroque periods, positive organs were used at many kinds of civil and religious functions. They were used in the homes and chapels of the rich, at banquets and court events, in choirs and music schools, and in the small orchestras of Jacopo Peri and Claudio Monteverdi at the dawn of the musical drama or opera.

== Construction ==
=== Casing ===
Many positives, both of the box and 'cupboard' types, can be divided into upper and lower parts to be more easily moved. The lower part then usually contains the bellows, blower and/or treadle, and perhaps a few of the largest pipes. Wheels, casters or a custom-made hand truck are other aids to mobility, which have become vastly more common in modern times.

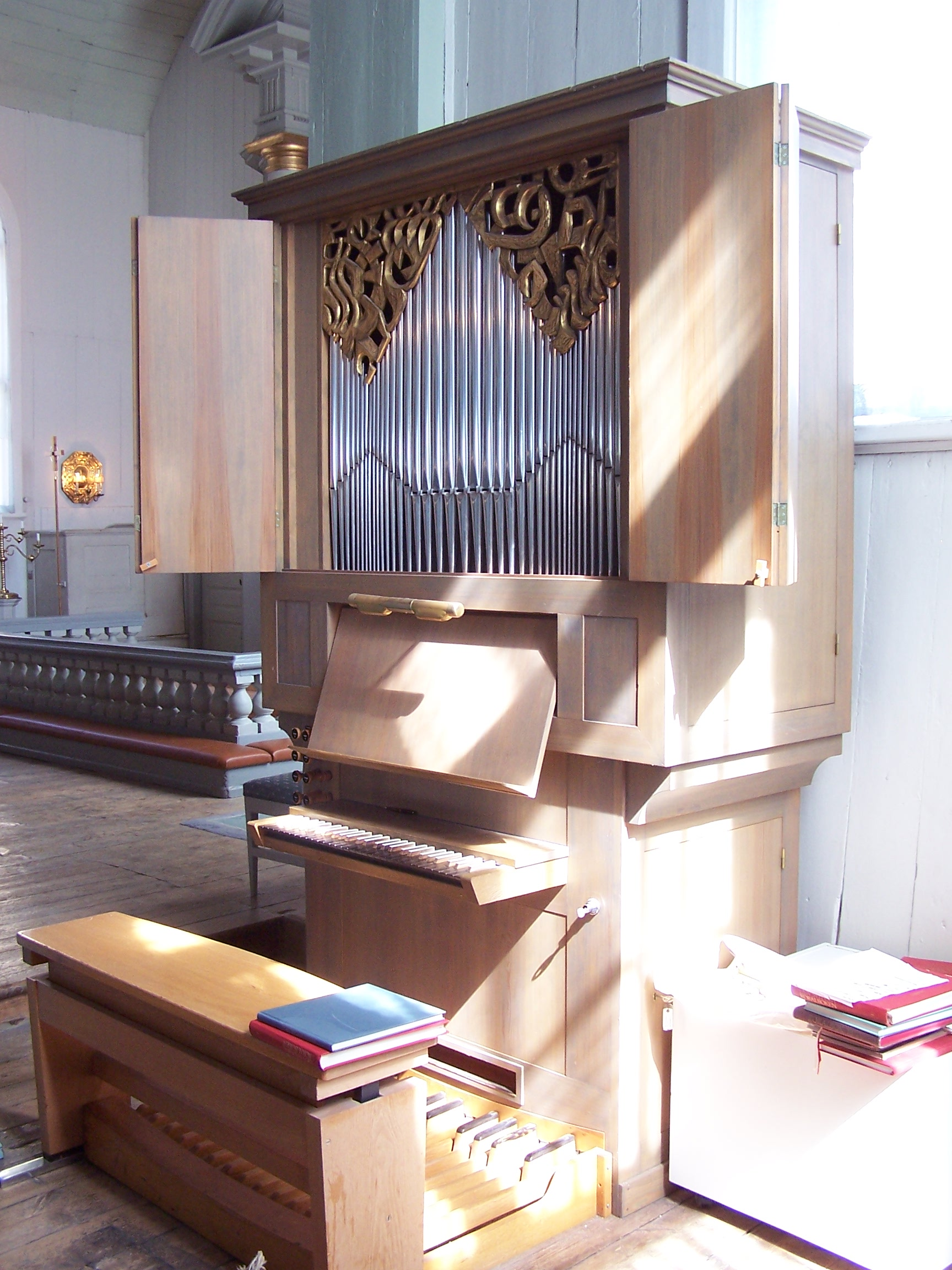
Positive organ in Karlskrona Admiralty Church, Sweden

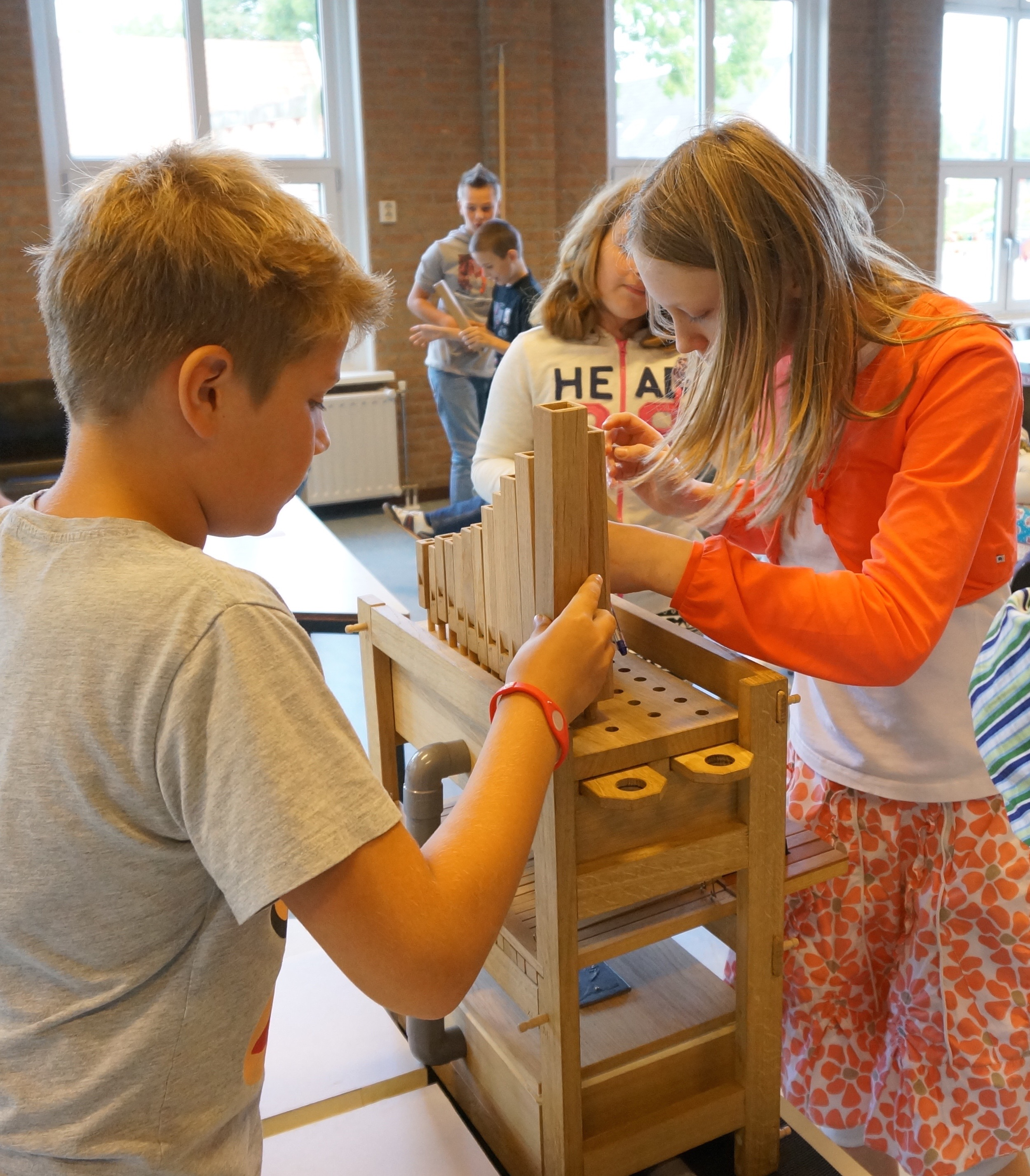
Children in primary school are assembling a do-organ of Orgelkids

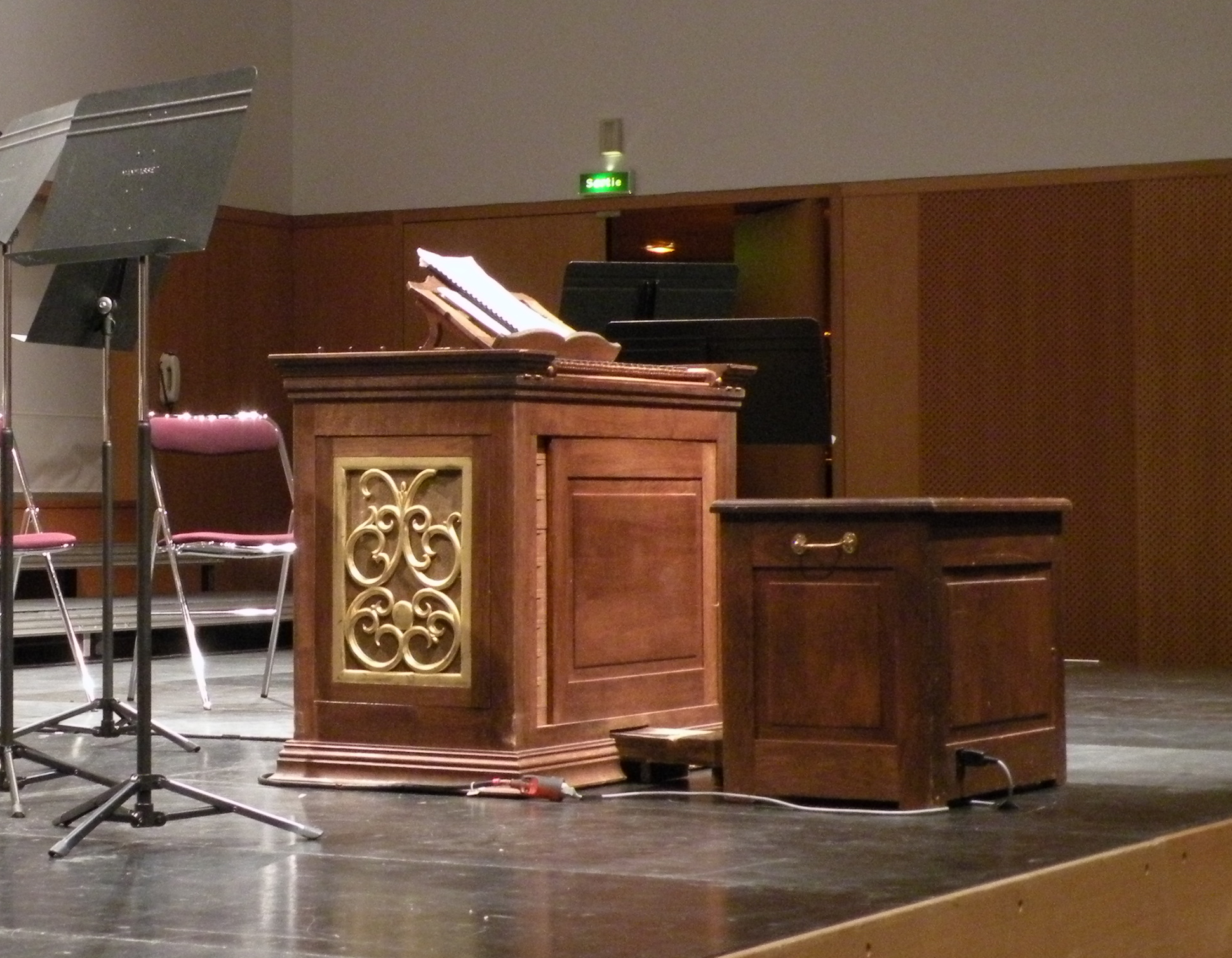
Chest, or box, organ used during La Folle Journée, 2009

=== Stops ===
Positive organs typically exhibit few stops due to their small size and portable nature; a specification of 8 ft Gedackt (capped), 4 ft flute and 2 ft principal (diapason) is common. Somewhat larger positives may also have a 2 2/3 ft or other mutation stop and/or a small mixture, and some have an 8 ft reed stop (such as a regal). Still larger positives may have a 4 ft principal or a second 8 ft stop, the latter often treble-only. More complex examples feature a divided keyboard, which allows each stop to be activated separately in the treble and bass portions of the keyboard. This makes it possible to play a melody and an accompaniment simultaneously on different registrations. Most positives have just one manual keyboard and no pedals, but there are examples with a set of pedal pulldowns or even a pedal stop or two, as well as rarer ones with two manuals.

=== Wind supply ===
Before electricity, positives required either the player or a second person to operate the bellows in order to supply wind to the instrument, but most modern positives include electric blowers for this purpose.

=== Compass and various ===
The positive organ differs from the portative organ in that it is larger and is not played while strapped at a right angle to the performer's body. It also has a larger keyboard (typically 49 notes or more in modern examples, often 45 or so notes with a short octave in older ones), while a portative may have as few as 12 or 13 notes. The positive is also not to be confused with the regal, a small keyboard instrument that contains short-length reed pipes.

However, since the Orgelbewegung revival of small organs, small positives to be played with both hands have also come to be called 'portatives' in many cases, especially when their pipes are arranged without housing in a chromatic row like in the genuine portative.

== Other uses of the term ==
The Positive is also a traditional division of a large organ, often placed behind the organist's back and more or less the size of a separate positive organ. In England it became known as a Chair organ, later to be corrupted into the Choir division found on Romantic and many modern organs. Also, since the Orgelbewegung, the German term Ruckpositiv (Rückpositiv) can be encountered in English.
