= Will Earhart =

American music educator

Will Earhart (April 1, 1871 - April 23, 1960) was a pioneering American music educator.

== Overview ==
Born in Franklin, Ohio, Earhart studied violin, piano, counterpoint and harmony. He began teaching in Miamisburg, Ohio and later became music supervisor in the public schools of Greenville, Ohio.

In 1898, he moved to Richmond, Indiana to become Director of the Richmond High School Orchestra, believed to be the first complete high school symphony orchestra. He helped to found The Richmond Civic Orchestra, a forerunner of the Richmond Symphony Orchestra.

In 1912, Earhart became Director of Music in the Pittsburgh Public Schools, where he remained until his retirement in 1940. In 1913, he founded the Department of Public School Music at the University of Pittsburgh.

He was a member of the Music Educators National Conference for nearly half a century and was its president in 1915. He is a member of the Music Educators Hall of Fame. He was also a member of Phi Mu Alpha Sinfonia fraternity, initiated as an honorary member in 1923 by the Iota chapter at Northwestern University.

He died in Portland, Oregon in 1960, aged 89.

== Philosophy ==
Earhart believed strongly in the value of musical beauty. He advocated teaching music with an emphasis on creating pleasing sounds, deriding the "machine-like chug-chug-chug-chug" that he heard from amplified bass instruments in 1950s rock and roll. At the forefront of the aesthetic education movement in the 1940s, Earhart outlined the three appeals of music as sensory, mind, and feelings, and believed that all children had the ability to be musical if properly nurtured. According to Earhart, music in the schools was fully justified on aesthetic, intellectual and educational, and social grounds. He believed music should be studied by all children, not just who might choose it as a profession, so they might enjoy it for the rest of their lives. He encouraged all people to avoid placing too much emphasis on material objects at the expense of those things of significant beauty that required time and effort to appreciate.

== Educational Innovations ==
Earhart was a pioneer in the expansion of the high school music program and the granting of credits to students enrolled in the classes. At the turn of the century, he developed a harmony course at Richmond High School and a course called "A Critical Study of Music." Through the study of sixteen composers from Bach to Wagner, Earhart emphasized the importance of context, form, and style. Since there were no recordings available, choruses formed the core materials, and Earhart made sure to have the best editions possible. In this early model for comprehensive musicianship, students sang and played the music, wrote essays, and took exams, receiving one half credit for each semester of work. In 1898 Earhart formed a school orchestra at Richmond, and although it usually met outside of school hours, these students also received a half credit each semester if they were deemed capable of public performance according to the high standards Earhart maintained for the group. The orchestra performed at many school events such as chapel services, commencements, and assemblies. Instrument gaps were filled with community members, alumni, and hired professionals when needed, but Earhart believed it was better to play good symphonic literature with thin instrumentation than to compromise the quality of the music. During this time Earhart also formed an adult chorus and the Richmond Civic Orchestra, and he organized annual festivals in which the school and community orchestras and choirs could perform together. Under the direction of Earhart, music education in the small town of Richmond, Indiana became so well known that music teachers made journeys to observe the programs, returning to implement the ideas in their own towns.

== Star Spangled Banner ==
Earhart chaired a committee of prominent musicians consisting also of Walter Damrosch, Arnold J. Gantvoort, Oscar Sonneck and John Philip Sousa tasked with developing a singular, standard version of the Star Spangled Banner. The committee was formed by the U.S. Bureau of Education at the behest of President Woodrow Wilson to recommend the official version of the song that would become the national anthem of the United States. The standardized version that was voted upon by these five musicians premiered at Carnegie Hall on December 5, 1917.

== Role in the MSNC ==
Earhart was a visionary leader in the Music Supervisors National Conference (MSNC), ably articulating the philosophical foundations of the organization. He was active in MSNC for almost fifty years and was a founding member, although he missed the first meeting in Keokuk because of Easter church responsibilities. Despite doubts that it could be accomplished, Earhart organized and led an orchestra made up of conference members at the 1921 MSNC meeting, including Edward Bailey Birge on viola and Osbourne McConathy on French horn. He continued to serve his profession until the end of his life, helping young teachers who sought his advice and writing articles for the Music Supervisors Journal supporting aesthetic education.
