= International Society for Philosophy of Music Education =

Organization for music education pedagogy

International Society for the Philosophy of Music Education (ISPME).
- Abbreviation: ISPME
- Formation: June 7, 2003; 23 years ago
- Type: Learned society
- Legal status: Society
- Purpose: Educational
- Region served: Worldwide
- Members: Music education professionals
- Official language: English
- Main organ: International symposia
- Website: ispme.net

The International Society for Philosophy of Music Education (ISPME) is an international scholarly organization for the field of music education philosophy. Music education philosophy is a field of study that examines such fundamental questions as "why and how should music be taught and learned?," while ISPME is an international organization devoted specifically to this specialized subject. ISPME members include professors of music, education, and philosophy at universities in Europe, Asia, Oceania, and the Americas.

== See also ==
- Philosophy of education
- Musicology
- Sociomusicology
- Aesthetics
