= Frances Elliott Clark =

Frances Elliott Clark (1860–1958) was an early music-appreciation advocate. As a teacher in twentieth century Ottumwa, Iowa, Clark spent ten minutes in each of her chorus rehearsals telling students about composers or helping them recognize the stylistic features of a work that made it possible to place it in its correct historical context. Shortly thereafter, the phonograph added new opportunities for students to listen to music. Clark, who by 1903 had moved to Milwaukee, told of her introduction to Edison's invention and of its potential. She realized the difference it could make to her students if they could hear professional recordings. Her principal agreed, and approved the purchase of a machine for the schools.

== Curriculum Development ==
Clark made herself an authority on the use of the phonograph to teach music to children and in 1910 spoke to the Wisconsin Teachers Association on "Victrolas in the Schools." Edward Bailey Birge, president of the Music Supervisors National Conference (later MENC), invited her to present this subject at his MSNC program in Detroit. Within a year she had moved to Camden, New Jersey, where she established an educational department for the Victor Talking Machine Company. She supervised the preparation of recordings designed for use in the classroom. Recordings were also developed to correlate music with English and American literature. Among other responsibilities, Clark assisted record and Victrola dealers in setting up educational displays to help music educators learn the benefits of the phonograph. Victor issued a number of instructional booklets prepared by Clark and assistants. Clark remained with Victor for the rest of her professional career but kept up with the times in the 1920s, when she promoted the radio as an avenue to music appreciation.
