= Manhattanville Music Curriculum Project =

Child-centered approach to music education

The Manhattanville Music Curriculum Project (MMCP) is a music education curricular plan that sought to improve music education through a child-centered approach.

== Rationale ==
MMCP is an alternative educational model to music education as a response to the declining interest in school music which is often noted in students as they grow older. The problems in music education the MMCP sought to address were the students’ rejection of music education upon reaching the stage of formal operations (logic & reasoning) observed by Jean Piaget, and the rejection of music in the educational environment as compared to the strong acceptance of music outside school.

Fostering the continued relevance of music to a student in school and contemporary society is a key purpose for MMCP in the areas of:

- Artistic Relevance – How can students recognize the aesthetic value of music?
- Personal Relevance – How can music satisfy the personal needs of students?
- Social Relevance – How can the changing nature of music in our society stay relevant to students as they grow older?

MMCP believes presenting music as changing and evolving rather than “static” like western art music increases the interest in new creation. Thus, when students act as musicians and not spectators, they discover comprehensive meaning on many levels of understanding.

== Learning Objectives ==
The MMCP learning objectives are to develop positive musical behaviors in students. MMCP does not focus on imparting factual music knowledge. Rather, learning and acquisition of musical information are the byproduct of the “doing” in performing and creating the music. The four behavioral objectives closely aligned with the MMCP process of learning are:

- Cognitive – Students using knowledge to solve problems.
- Attitudinal – Students excited about their own creative musical potential and their aesthetic sensitivity to music.
- Skill – Dexterous movement behaviors in performing vocally, or on instruments. Translative notational skill to perform music and Aural music listening behaviors.
- Aesthetic – Students understanding intrinsic meaning in music.

Students evaluate themselves on their own personal achievement of these objectives. Teacher serves to not evaluate the student but to evaluate how well the curriculum is working and modify accordingly to each student.

== Focus ==
The four main areas of MMCP focus are:

- Discovery - Learning by creating is the most exciting way to retain, understand, and learn music.
- Concepts & Skills - Going through the task-oriented process of deciding how to create music using concepts from all styles and periods.
- Music of Today - Students should understand and create the music of their contemporary environment.
- Totality - Students gain a complete understanding of music by; composing, performing, conducting, listening, enjoying, sharing, and reacting.

== Sequence ==
The MMCP uses a spiral curriculum that sequentially introduces new concepts in action-oriented cycles that are developmentally appropriate. The "spiral curriculum" concept was first proposed by Jerome Bruner in 1960, and has since been the model for many school curricula in the US. A typical MMCP sequence of events is as follows:

1) Strategy - Teacher presents a framework for introducing a musical problem (often in the form of a question) that inspires creative thought. The problem must be well-defined, well-diversified, and able to be solved creatively by all students.

2) Composing & Rehearsing - Students solve the musical problem in group composition projects by developing a musical hypothesis and testing it using aural logic. Critical thought should be used in solving the problem, and all students are encouraged to experiment.

3) Performance - After groups rehearse their compositions, a performance typically takes place to share ideas. From the experimenting process in designing their composition, the students have developed necessary musical skills needed to perform.

4) Critical Evaluation - Students may have an oral discussion after the performance to discuss and evaluate themselves. They may also record the performance for critical analysis at a later time.

5) Listening - Students listen to music for pleasure or as a resource to discover new ideas.

The teacher's role in this sequence is the creator of the musical problem yet an unobtrusive observer. Students should view the teacher as a resource rather than an evaluator. A teacher does not impose judgement on students' creations, but rather acts as the "facilitator of discovery."
