= Joseph E. Maddy =

American music conductor and educator (1892–1966)

- Born: Joseph Edgar Maddy; October 14, 1892; Wellington, Kansas, U.S.
- Died: April 18, 1966 (aged 73); Traverse City, Michigan, U.S.
- Occupations: Educator, conductor
- Spouse: Alice Fay Pettit

Joseph Edgar Maddy (October 14, 1892 – April 18, 1966) was an American music educator and conductor.

Maddy was the founder of the Interlochen Center for the Arts and became one of the most influential figures in American music education during the twentieth century.

== Early life ==
He was born in Wellington, Kansas on October 14, 1892, the son of teachers William and Mary (née Harrington) Maddy. He had one brother, Harry.

He attended Wichita College of Music in Wichita, Kansas, where he studied violin and later joined the Minneapolis Symphony Orchestra.

Maddy became one of the first supervisors of instrumental music in American public schools in 1918 in Rochester, New York. After a short time in Rochester, he was encouraged by Will Earhart to take a position at Morton High School in Richmond, Indiana, where he helped continue the school and community music program established by Earhart.

== Career ==
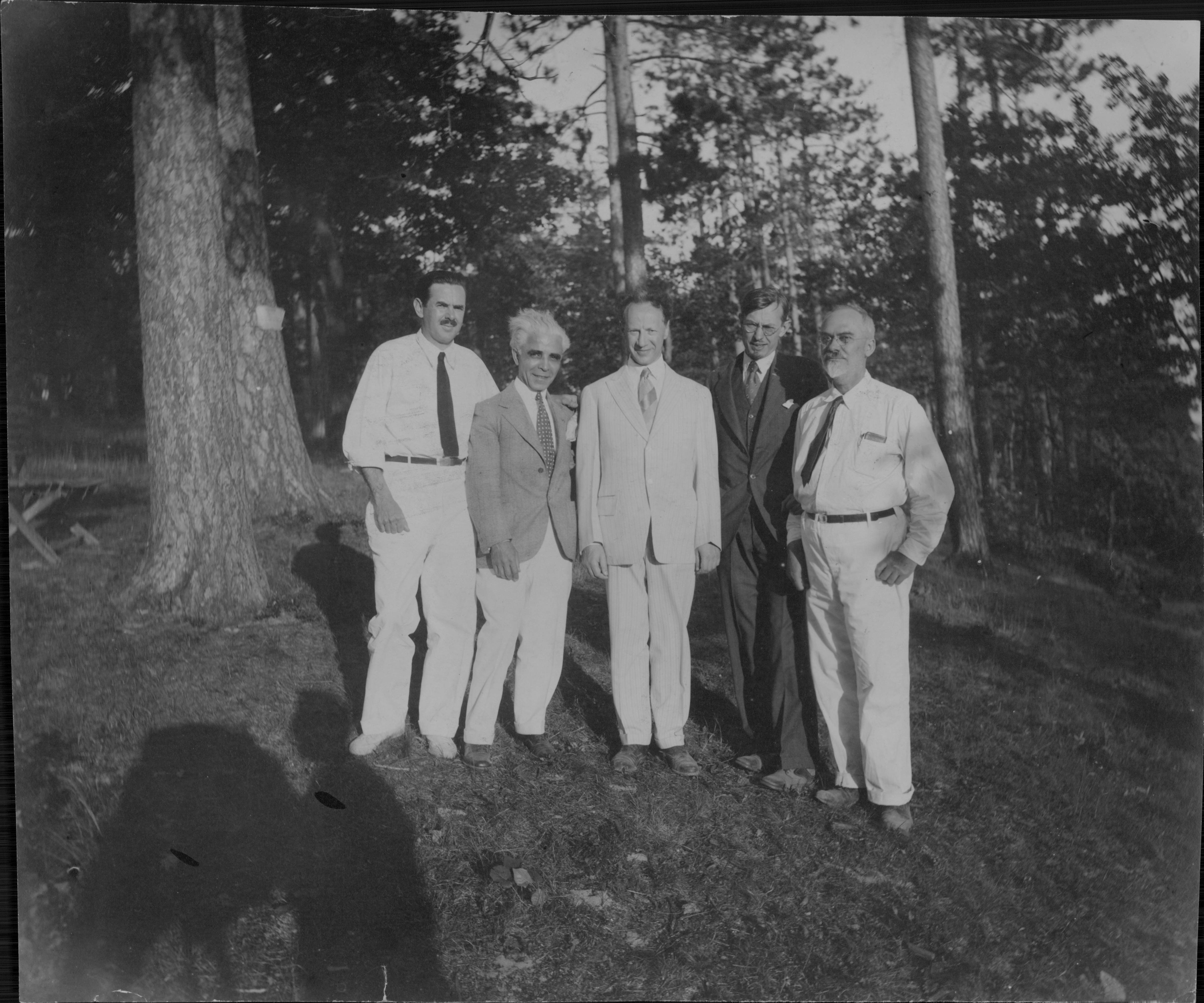
Maddy (farthest left), with (left to right) Pasquale Montani, Ossip Gabrilowitsch, Howard Hanson, and Thaddeus P. Giddings, all of whom contributed to the founding of Interlochen Center for the Arts.

In 1924, Maddy moved to Ann Arbor to become supervisor of music in public schools and head of the music department for the University of Michigan, where he developed one of the nation's early conducting courses.

While at the university, Maddy organized the first National High School Orchestra, which performed at the Music Supervisors National Conference in Detroit in 1926.

In 1928, Maddy founded the National High School Orchestra and Band Camp in Interlochen, Michigan, near Traverse City. The organization later became the Interlochen Center for the Arts, one of the most recognized arts education institutions in the United States.

While at the University of Michigan, Maddy also collaborated with Thaddeus P. Giddings on radio-based music education programs that broadcast instructional content nationally through NBC radio networks. The programs became an early example of large-scale remote arts education in the United States.

In 1941, Maddy became the fourth music director of the Ann Arbor Symphony Orchestra. During his tenure, he expanded the orchestra and supported scholarship efforts allowing Michigan students to attend Interlochen.

Maddy additionally authored and collaborated on several instructional music publications including the Universal Teacher, Tritone Folio, and the Modern School Graded Orchestra Books.

== Later life ==
He was a member of the Epsilon chapter of Phi Mu Alpha Sinfonia, and received the Charles E. Lutton Man of Music Award at the fraternity's 1960 National Convention.

Maddy was also a National Patron of Delta Omicron, an international professional music fraternity, and received an honorary degree from Earlham College in 1965.

Maddy died on April 18, 1966, in Traverse City, Michigan, and was buried at Oakwood Cemetery in Traverse City.

== Legacy ==
Maddy is regarded as a major figure in the expansion of organized youth arts education in the United States during the twentieth century. His work through Interlochen helped establish a national model for intensive arts education and youth orchestral training.

In 1962, Maddy and Interlochen performers were welcomed to the White House by President John F. Kennedy during a national performance appearance, reflecting Interlochen's growing national cultural significance.

Interlochen later commemorated Maddy's founding vision through annual “Just an Idea” celebrations recognizing the origins and continued cultural impact of the institution.

The founding of Interlochen Arts Academy in 1962 expanded Maddy's original National High School Orchestra Camp into a year-round arts institution that later became internationally recognized for music, theater, dance, visual arts, creative writing, and interdisciplinary arts education.

In 2020, M-137, a highway serving Interlochen Center for the Arts, was decommissioned by the Michigan Department of Transportation. Upon the roadway's transfer to the Grand Traverse County Road Commission, the roadway was renamed "J. Maddy Parkway" in his honor.

Maddy's family remained associated with Interlochen through later generations, including his son Richard Arthur "Dick" Maddy, who later served as comptroller of Interlochen Arts Academy and worked as a musician and instrument craftsman.
