= Wiley Lee Housewright =

American music educator

Wiley Lee Housewright, EdD (17 October 1913 Wylie, Texas – 13 December 2003 Tallahassee) was an American music educator and longtime dean of music at Florida State University. He was the author of A History of Music and Dance in Florida, 1565-1865.

== Career highlights ==
1934–1941: Director of Music, public schools in Texas and New York
1942–1943: Lecturer of Music, New York University
1946–1947: Assistant Professor of Music, The University of Texas at Austin
1947–1980: Professor of Music, School of Music, Florida State University, Tallahassee
1961–1962: Distinguished professor, Florida State University, Tallahassee
1966–1979: Dean, School of Music, Florida State University, Tallahassee
1968–1970: President, Music Educators National Conference (MENC)

== Formal education ==
1934: Bachelor of Science, University of North Texas, Denton
1938: Master of Arts, Columbia University, New York City
1943: EdD, New York University, New York City

== See also ==
- The Housewright Symposium / Vision 2020
- Tanglewood Symposium
