= GO Project =

American music education project

The Goals and Objectives Project (GO Project) was established in 1969 to implement the recommendations of the Tanglewood symposium. Paul R. Lehman led the project. A steering committee was appointed along with eight subcommittees, each of which was charged with the investigation of, and recommendations for, specific aspects of music education.

After the recommendations had been considered, the Music Educators National Conference (MENC) appointed two commissions: The MENC National Commission on Organizational Development and the MENC National Commission on Instruction. The Commission on Organizational Development was to prepare the way for recommended changes in organization, structure, and function of the Conference, including all of its federated and affiliated units. The National Commission on Instruction was created to monitor the way music was being taught in the schools. Its first study resulted in the publication of The School Music Program: Description and Standards (1974, revised in 1986).

== The School Music Program: Description and Standards ==
The two editions of The School Music Program are considered to be the precursors of the National Standards for Arts Education, published in 1994 in line with Goals 2000. The document includes ten rationales for music, ten outcomes of the successful music program (which closely resemble the nine National Standards of 1994), and a description of the guidelines for curriculum and implementation. Throughout the publication, two levels of standards are provided: basic and quality. The body of the publication is devoted to the following areas:

- music in early childhood
- elementary school
- middle school and junior high
- high school

There are a few paragraphs devoted to beyond high school, conceding the difficulty in provided explicit standards for musical learning beyond high school. The four main sections include the following:

- a list of skills that students should have by the completion of each grade level. The skills are divided into performing/reading, listening/describing, and valuing.
- standards for implementation including scheduling/course offerings, staffing, materials/equipment, and facilities.

The conclusion of the document is a brief description of evaluation, including six principles of evaluation.

== See also ==
- Tanglewood Symposium
- MENC: The National Association for Music Education
