= Philip C. Hayden =

Philip Cady Hayden (November 20, 1854 – June 1, 1925) was the primary force in organizing the Music Supervisors National Conference, later the Music Educators National Conference (MENC). He was appointed the first supervisor of music in Quincy, Illinois in 1888. In 1900 the administration decided that a capitol fund was necessary and eliminated the music supervisor position in the system. For this reason he moved to Keokuk, Iowa to take the position of music supervisor. Hayden founded The School Music Monthly in 1900. In 1904, it became the official publication of National Education Association's Department of Music Education. The periodical was dedicated to a broad spectrum of issues dealing with public school music education. Hayden was editor of this publication for many years and was a frequent contributor.

== The Beginnings of the MSNC ==
The beginning of the MENC was an invitation by Hayden to come together in Keokuk and observe his work there. The invitation resulted from the cancellation of the 1906 meeting of the National Education Association because of the San Francisco earthquake. The second meeting of the new group was held in Indianapolis in 1909, but a constitution was not adopted until 1910 in Cincinnati, where the group officially became the Music Supervisors National Conference. The appearance of the organization at a time when it could contribute to the expansion of American society in the second and third decades of the twentieth century was due to the foresight of P.C. Hayden.
