= Orgelkids =

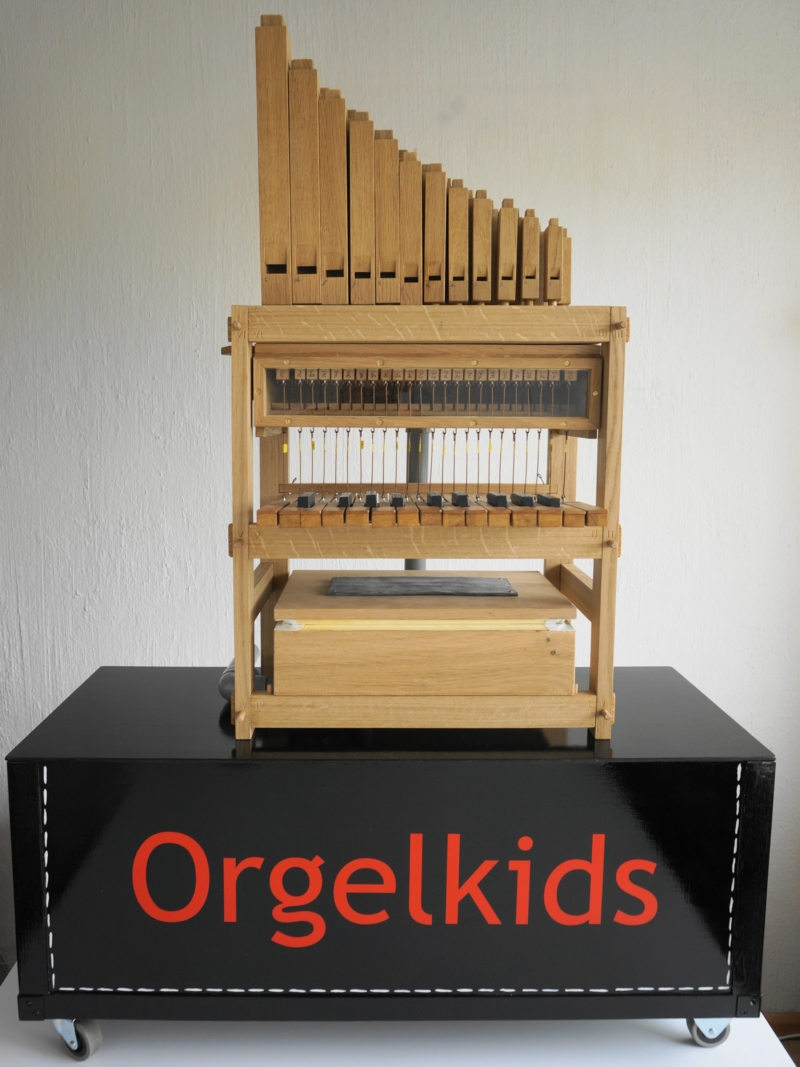
The Do-organ of Orgelkids

Orgelkids (Dutch, "organkids") is an educational project meant to familiarize and educate children with the pipe organ musical instrument. The project was initiated in the Netherlands in 2009 by Lydia Vroegindeweij and is directed towards cultural legacy and music education. Initially the project consisted of a website with educational tips and lesson suggestions to organize, among other projects, an excursion to a large pipe organ. Since 2013, Orgelkids has at its disposal a specially developed educational organ assembly kit. A complete, craftsman-built organ, in unassembled component parts, is contained in a lesson box. The instrument can be assembled and subsequently played. This so-called Do-organ is acquired or rented out by Orgelkids to schools, churches, organists, organ builders, organ teachers, or organ enthusiasts who want to organize educational activities for children and/or adults.

== Background ==
The classical pipe organ is almost always built in a fixed location in a building and not very accessible for children. Due to increased secularization of society, fewer children attend churches, so they have fewer occasions to spontaneously experience a pipe organ. Many smaller churches in North America have electronic organs.

In the Netherlands there is a wealth of historical organs. Preserving and maintaining this cultural legacy requires a continuing flow of new organists and organ builders. To encourage this, in order to give more children exposure to organs, Orgelkids has made a special instrument available to schools. An organist or organ builder visits the school with the Do-organ and supervises the students as they build the organ.

The Orgelkids project has been brought into the Dutch "Stichting Kerk Muziek Netwerk" (Church Music Network Foundation) since 2013. This non-profit foundation engages to make relevant aspects of church music accessible to the greater public.

== Orgelkids Do-organ ==
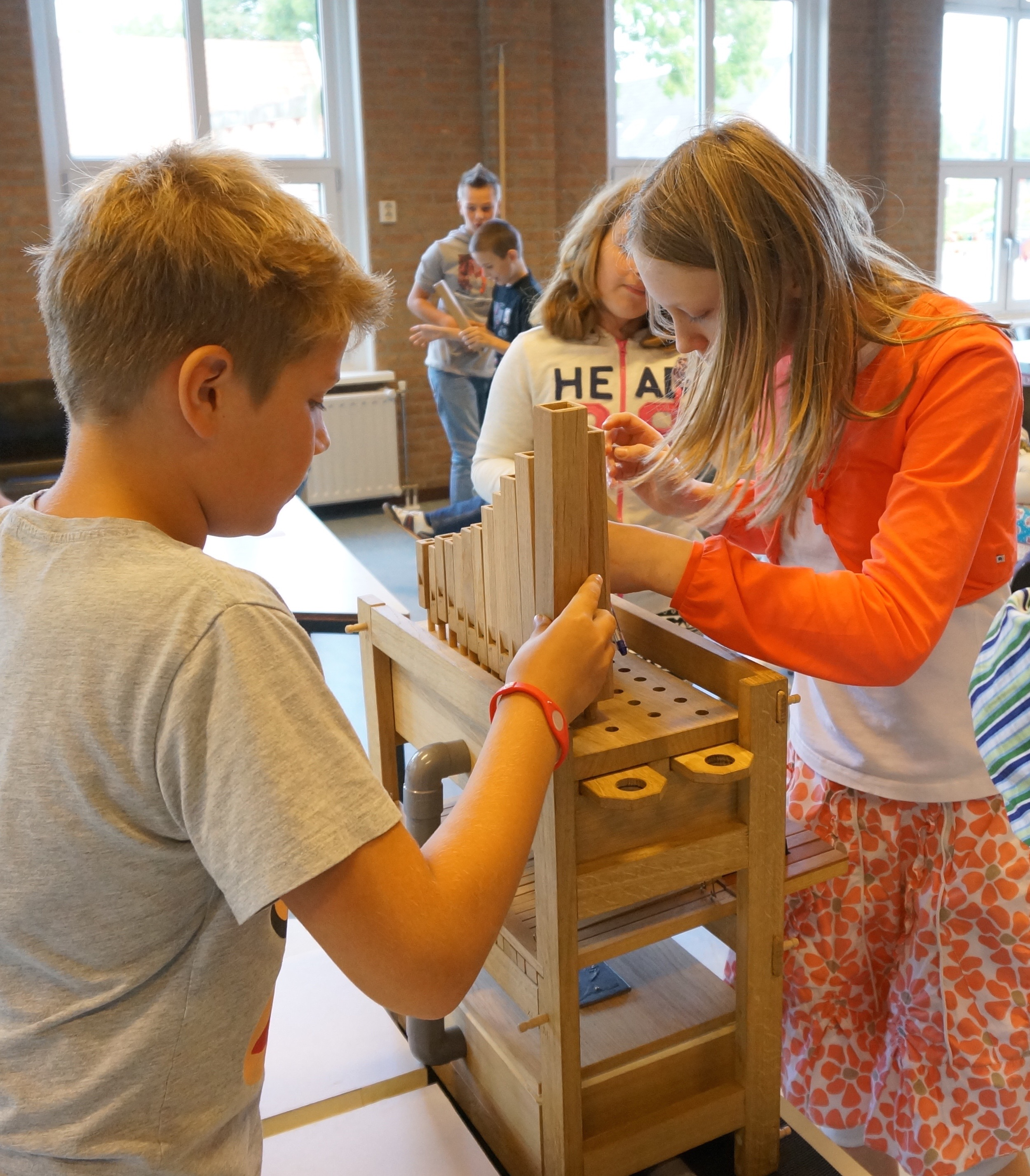
Children in primary school are assembling the Do-organ

An organ in a lesson box is a unique concept, first conceived and built by Dutch organ builder Wim Janssen specially for the goal of educating children with the technology and playing of the organ. It is not a demonstration organ with just a few keys, but a real instrument with which children can self-discover how it works. That is the reason it was given the name, "Do-organ." The Orgelkids instrument is a mechanical, tracker organ with two octaves (24 keys) and two registers which can be used independently or in combination. Air (wind in organ parlance) is supplied by a hand-pumped bellows.

All the materials used are identical to those used in a large pipe organ (such as oak wood and sheep leather). Children experience the value and quality of craftsman-made instruments.

The lesson box is supplied with instruction manuals which include many photos, by which children can assemble the organ with a minimum of instructions, in about 45 minutes. In addition, there are other lesson materials available such as an instructional video by the builder, an e-book, and a presentation for a digital blackboard.

Ton Stevens, organist of the basilica of St. John in Oosterhout, the Netherlands, works with kids on World Animal Day in the basilica every year. First they build and play the Do-organ of Orgelkids, and afterwards the children can take a look at the "real" organ built by Michaël Maarschalkerweerd in 1890. Of course songs like Old MacDonald Had a Farm are played on the organ on the occasion of that special day.

== International developments ==
Orgelkids started in the Netherlands in 2013 with a single lesson box. The home for this organ is in the Amersfoort region, which is in the center of the country. In the first year, 1350 children were reached. In 2015 it was expanded with a second organ which is based in Belgium, operating out of Antwerp. In its first year there, 800 children were reached.

The project has attracted more international attention. In Oregon a sister project, Orgelkids USA, an educational 501c3 nonprofit, was launched in 2016 with the mission to help grow a nationwide network of independent kits. They helped place five organ kits built by the US builders in their first year. Orgelkids USA kits are being commissioned to serve as regional resources by chapters of the American Guild of Organists as well as by non-profit organizations whose missions are pipe organ related.

== Training for organ builders ==
Since 2016, Orgelkids has been supporting the training of organ builders and the passing down of artisanal skills. Organ building shops can have apprentice builders work on an Orgelkids instrument during their practical training. In doing so they develop all manner of practical skills which are also needed in the building or restoration of large, monumental organs. After completion, the organ kit can be made available for educational projects. For those who wish to build an organ kit themselves, building instructions are available including 20 technical drawings that correspond to the original organ.

== Honours ==
In 2022 Orgelkids won the competition for Religious Heritage Innovator of the Year. This European competition was launched by 'Future for Religious Heritage' (FRH), an organisation, founded in 2011 and dedicated to the safeguarding of Europe's religious heritage. The jury decided that "by passing on knowledge about organ pipes to the younger generation, Orgelkids is playing a key role in guaranteeing a future for the organ." The award ceremony took place in Lund, Sweden, on 21 April 2023, during the biennial conference of the FRH.

== Orgelkids USA ==
US-based Orgelkids USA was founded in June 2015 as a program of the Eugene Oregon USA chapter of the American Guild of Organists, and later incorporated on 29 August 2016 as a section-501(c)(3) non-profit organization. Orgelkids USA shares a similar educational and outreach agenda as the original Netherlands-based Orgelkids organization, serving as a pilot program for the US and helping grow a nationwide network of independent organ kits. Orgelkids USA was launched with a generous grant by the New York City American Guild of Organists (AGO) ' Centennial Millennium Fund, similar grants from the San Francisco and Seattle chapters of AGO and a social media fundraising campaign. 2017 was an inaugural year of outreach programing in the USA with two Orgelkids USA kits reaching over 700 people.
