= Comprehensive Musicianship =

1965 seminar held at Northwestern University

In 1965 the Seminar on Comprehensive Musicianship was held at Northwestern University. Its purpose was to develop and implement means of improving the education of music teachers. In 1967 a symposium was held at Airlie House (a conference center) in Warrenton, Virginia, to discuss means of evaluating comprehensive musicianship. The resultant document, Procedures for Evaluation of Music in Contemporary Education, offers guidelines for the evaluation of techniques and attitudes acquired through comprehensive musicianship studies.

There are two curricula that are examples of the Comprehensive Musicianship methodology: The Manhattanville Music Curriculum Program and the Hawaii Music Curriculum Program.

== Manhattanville Music Curriculum Program ==
The Manhattanville Music Curriculum Program (MMCP) was funded by a grant from the U.S. Dept. of Education and was named for Manhattanville College in Purchase, New York. Its objectives were to develop a music curriculum and related materials for a sequential music learning program for the primary grades through high school. The project produced the Synthesis, a comprehensive curriculum for grades 3 through 12, Interaction, an early childhood curriculum, and three feasibility studies: The Electronic Keyboard Laboratory, the Science-Music Program, and the Instrumental Program.

MMCP began in 1965 with an exploratory of 92 innovative and experimental music programs. Phase One (1966) dealt with perspectives of student learning potentials, problems of curriculum reform, and classroom procedures. Phase Two (1967) dealt with the refinement and synthesis of information gained in the first exploratory period and the organization of information into a feasible curriculum. Phase Three (1968) consisted of the refinement and field testing of all curriculum items, the initial investigation of a separate curriculum for early childhood, the preparation and testing of plans for teacher retraining, and the development of an assessment instrument that reflected the program objectives.

== Hawaii Music Curriculum Program ==
The Hawaii Music Curriculum Program began in 1968 under the sponsorship of the Hawaii Curriculum Center in Honolulu. Its purpose was to create a logical, continuous educational program ensuring the competent guidance of the music education of all children in the state's public schools and to test and assemble the materials needed by schools to realize this program. Students are to be involved with music in school in the same ways that people are involved with music in the outside world. The curriculum is based on seven basic concepts: tone, rhythm, melody, harmony, form, tonality, and texture, that are presented in the form of a spiral curriculum. The taxonomy of concepts was translated into a curriculum by means of division into five "zones."

== See also ==
- Contemporary Music Project
