= Contemporary Music Project =

In 1957, the Ford Foundation began to explore the relationship between arts and American society. Resulting from a suggestion by Norman Dello Joio, the Young Composers Project (YCP) was founded in 1959. Funded by the Ford Foundation and administered by the National Music Council, the project placed young composers (age 35 and under) in public school systems as composers-in-residence.

From 1959 to 1962, 31 composers participated in the project. They discovered that many music educators were not prepared to deal with contemporary music. In 1962 the YCP was elevated from a pilot program to one of the ten major projects of the Ford Foundation. The Music Educators National Conference (MENC) submitted a proposal to the Ford Foundation that the project be expanded to include seminars and workshops on contemporary music in the schools, and that pilot programs be established in public schools. In 1963 the Ford Foundation awarded MENC a grant of $1,380,000 to organize the Contemporary Music Project for Creativity in Music Education. YCP continued under the title Composers in Public Schools. By 1968, 46 more composers had been matched with public school systems.

One of the first activities of the Contemporary Music Project was the establishment of 16 workshops and seminars held at various colleges throughout the country to help teachers better understand contemporary music. Six pilot projects were established in schools, including the Baltimore, San Diego, and Farmingdale, New York systems.

In 1965 the Seminar on Comprehensive Musicianship was held at Northwestern University. Its purpose was to develop and implement means of improving the education of music teachers. In 1967 a symposium was held at Arlie House in Warrenton, Virginia to discuss means of evaluating Comprehensive Musicianship. The resultant document, Procedures for Evaluation of Music in Contemporary Education, offers guidelines for the evaluation of techniques and attitudes acquired through comprehensive musicianship studies.

In 1968 the Ford Foundation gave MENC a grant of $1,340,000 to administer the Contemporary Music Project for an additional five years. MENC contributed $50,000 per year. From 1968 to 1973 the Contemporary Music Project consisted of three programs: Professionals-in-Residence to Communities, the Teaching of Comprehensive Musicianship, and Complementary Activities.

== Bibliography ==
Mark, M. (1986). Contemporary Music Education. New York: Schirmer Books.
