= The Ann Arbor Symposium =

Art symposium

In 1978, 1979, and 1981 the Music Educators National Conference sponsored the Ann Arbor Symposium on the Applications of Psychology to the Teaching and Learning of Music at the University of Michigan. The University of Michigan and the Theodore Presser Foundation were co-sponsors. The purpose of the Symposium was to explore the relationship between research in certain areas of behavioral psychology and music education.

== Sessions ==
In Session I (1978), papers were presented by leading music education researchers to acquaint the participating psychologists with music education practices, and to present issues to which research psychologists might contribute their knowledge and expertise.

Session II (1979) consisted of presentations of papers by the psychologists on the topics discussed by the music educators the year before. Each presentation in Session I was followed by a response from a psychologist, and in Session II by a music educator.

== Bibliography ==
- Mark, M.L. (1986). Contemporary Music Education. New York: Schirmer Books.
- Documentary Report of the Ann Arbor Symposium: Applications of Psychology to the Teaching and Learning of Music.(1981). Reston: Music Educators National Conference.
- Documentary Report of the Ann Arbor Symposium Session III: Applications of Psychology to the Teaching and Learning of Music.(1983). Reston: Music Educators National Conference.
