= Tanglewood Symposium =

1967 music education conference in Massachusetts, United States

The Tanglewood Symposium was a conference that took place from July 23 to August 2, 1967, in Tanglewood, Massachusetts. It was sponsored by the Music Educators National Conference (MENC) in cooperation with the Berkshire Music Center, the Theodore Presser Foundation, and the School of Fine and Applied Arts of Boston University. The purpose was to discuss and define the role of music education in contemporary American society and to make recommendations to improve the effectiveness of music instruction. Participants included sociologists, scientists, labor leaders, educators, representatives of corporations, musicians, and people involved with other aspects of music.

== The Symposium ==
Position papers had been published in the March and April 1967 issues of the Music Educators Journal. The papers served as the bases for discussion at the 1967 MENC divisional conferences and for the Tanglewood Symposium. The sessions were moderated by Max Kaplan, Wiley Lee Housewright (1913–2003), Allen P. Britton, David P. McAllester, and Karl D. Ernst. Three broad questions were considered:

- What are the characteristics and desirable ideologies for an emerging and postindustrial society?
- What are the values and unique functions of music and other arts for individuals and communities in such a society?
- How may these potentials be attained?

== The Tanglewood Declaration ==
The Tanglewood Symposium is summarized in the statement entitled "The Tanglewood Declaration," which provided a philosophical basis for future developments in music education. Of particular importance, the Declaration called for music to be placed in the core of the school curriculum.

- a. Music serves best when its integrity as an art is maintained.
- b. Music of all periods, styles, forms, and cultures belongs in the curriculum. The musical repertory should be expanded to involve music of our time in its rich variety, including currently popular teenage music and avant-garde music, American folk music, and the music of other cultures.
- c. Schools and colleges should provide adequate time for music programs ranging from pre-school through adult or continuing education.
- d. Instruction in the arts should be a general and important part of education in the senior high school.
- e. Developments in educational technology, educational television, programmed instruction, and computer-assisted instruction should be applied to music study and research.
- f. Greater emphasis should be placed on helping the individual student to fulfill their needs, goals, and potentials.
- g. The music education profession must contribute its skills, proficiencies, and insights toward assisting in the solution of urgent social problems as in the "inner city" or other areas with culturally deprived individuals.
- h. Programs of teacher education must be expanded and improved to provide music teachers who are specially equipped to teach high school courses in the history and literature of music, courses in the humanities and related arts, as well as teachers equipped to work with the very young, with adults, with the disadvantaged, and with the emotionally disturbed.

== See also ==
- GO Project
- Music Educators National Conference
