= Yale Seminar =

The Yale Seminar took place at Yale University, June 17–28, 1963 to consider the problems facing music education and to propose possible solutions. President John F. Kennedy appointed the Panel on Educational Research and Development, which recommended that the K-12 music curriculum of previous decades be examined to discover why school music programs had not produced a musically literate and active public. The U.S. Office of Education Cooperative Research Program awarded a grant to Yale University, and Claude V. Palisca was appointed director of the Yale Seminar. Two areas of concern were identified: music materials and music performance.

== Recommendations ==
Recommendations of the Yale Seminar were:

- The school music repertory should be broadened.
- The basic goal of the K-12 music curriculum should be the development of musicality.
- The music curriculum should be expanded to include listening to worthwhile music literature.
- Performance activities should include ensembles for which a varied and authentic repertory has been developed.
- Advanced theory and literature courses should be available.
- Musicians, scholars, and composers should be brought into schools.
- Programs should take advantage of community resources.
- Opportunities for advanced study in metropolitan areas should be made available to talented students throughout the country.
- Greater use can be made of audiovisual aids.
- There should be a related plan for teacher training and retraining.

== Juilliard Repertory Project ==
After the conclusion of the Yale Seminar, Dean Gideon Waldrop of Juilliard applied for a grant from the United States Office of Education to develop a large body of authentic and meaningful music materials to augment and enrich the repertory available to music teachers in the early grades. The grant was approved and the Project was established in July, 1964 with Vittorio Giannini as director. The Music Educators National Conference (MENC) indicated its support in the Music Educators Journal. The purpose of the Project was to collect music of high quality to be used for teaching grades K-6. The repertory was compiled by three groups: musicologists, music educators, and public elementary school music teachers. 230 vocal and instrumental works were included in the Juilliard Repertory Library.

== See also ==
- MIT Seminar XXI

== Bibliography ==
- Mark, M. (1986). Contemporary Music Education. New York: Schirmer Books.
