= Robert Duke (music scholar) =

American music scholar

Robert Duke is an American music scholar, currently the Marlene and Morton H. Meyerson Centennial Professor of Music and Human Learning and University Distinguished Teaching Professor at the Sarah and Ernest Butler School of Music at The University of Texas at Austin. He also holds appointments as Elizabeth Shatto Massey Distinguished Fellow in Teacher Education and clinical professor at the Dell Medical School.

== Education and academic positions ==
Duke earned his Bachelor of Music Education (B.M.E.) degree, summa cum laude, from Florida State University in 1976, and his PhD from Florida State in 1983. He has held numerous academic leadership roles, and he currently directs the Center for Music Learning at the University of Texas at Austin.

== Research and contributions ==
Duke's research focuses on human learning and behavior, with an emphasis on motor learning, cognitive psychology, and neuroscience. His interdisciplinary approach connects music education with the broader domains of psychology and pedagogy, contributing significantly to the field of music learning and teacher development.

== Publications ==
He is the author of the widely referenced book Intelligent Music Teaching: Essays on the Core Principles of Effective Instruction, which outlines the foundational ideas behind effective teaching in music. He is also co-author of The Habits of Musicianship: A Radical Approach to Beginning Band, a curriculum guide that promotes musical thinking and creativity from the earliest stages of music instruction.

== Awards and recognition ==
Duke is a recipient of the Friar Centennial Teaching Fellowship, one of the most prestigious teaching honors at the University of Texas at Austin. He was an early inductee in The University of Texas at Austin Academy of Distinguished Teachers, and has served as president of that organization. He is also a member and past president of the University of Texas System Academy of Distinguished Teachers. He has also been recognized for his distinguished service and innovation in teacher education through the Elizabeth Shatto Massey Distinguished Fellowship.
