= Edward Bailey Birge =

Edward Bailey Birge (June 12, 1868 in Northampton, Massachusetts–1952) was a founding member of the Music Supervisors National Conference, which later became the Music Educators National Conference (MENC). Birge served as president of the organization from 1910–1911, and also as chairmen of the editorial board for the Music Educators Journal for many years. He originated the "MEJ Clubs" on college campuses that made possible student memberships. Though the clubs, the Journal was used in classes with prospective teachers. This greatly increased the circulation of the magazine. In recognition of his long service to the Journal and to the Conference, the MENC board of directors named him chairman emeritus. Birge is also remembered for writing the first history of American music education. He was a member of Phi Mu Alpha Sinfonia fraternity for men in music, initiated with Paul J. Weaver and Clarence C. Birchard in April 1924 at the national convention of MENC held in Cincinnati, Ohio.
