= David G. Hebert =

Musicologist and comparative educationist

- Born: 1972 (age 53–54); Seattle, Washington
- Education: University of Washington
- Known for: Sociomusicology, wind bands in Japan, music competitions, pluralism in music education, nationalism in music, historical ethnomusicology, popular music pedagogy, online music education
- Scientific career
- Fields: Music education, ethnomusicology, comparative education, East Asian studies, sociomusicology, cultural policy
- Workplaces: Grieg Academy, Western Norway University of Applied Sciences
- Thesis: Music Competition, Cooperation, and Community: An Ethnography of a Japanese School Band (2005)
- Doctoral advisor: Patricia Shehan Campbell
- Other academic advisors: David Boersema, Charles Keil
- Doctoral students: Ari Poutiainen
- Website: Sociomusicology

David G. Hebert (/ɛˈbɛər/; born 1972) is a musicologist and comparative educationist. He is a Professor of Music at Western Norway University of Applied Sciences (Bergen, Norway), where he leads the Grieg Academy Music Education (GAME) research group. He has contributed to the fields of music education, ethnomusicology, sociomusicology, comparative education, and East Asian Studies. Since 2018, he has been the manager of the Nordic Network for Music Education, a multinational state-funded organization that sponsors intensive Master courses and exchange of university music lecturers and students across Northern Europe. He is also a visiting professor in Sweden with the Malmo Academy of Music at Lund University and an honorary professor with the Education University of Hong Kong. He has previously been sponsored by East Asian governments as a visiting research scholar with Nichibunken in Kyoto, Japan, and the Central Conservatory of Music, in Beijing, China. He also serves in various leadership roles with the International Society for Music Education.

== Education and career ==
Hebert has worked for Sibelius Academy, Boston University College of Fine Arts, Lomonosov Moscow State University, Te Wananga o Aotearoa, University of Southern Mississippi, Tokyo Gakugei University and the International Research Center for Japanese Studies. From 2012, he lectured in Beijing for postgraduate seminars at China Conservatory, and in 2015 was a visiting professor in Brazil with the music PhD program at Federal University of Rio Grande do Sul. In recent years, Hebert has spoken at music conferences in Poland, Estonia, Sweden, Norway, China, Tanzania, and Uzbekistan. Hebert also serves on editorial boards of several scholarly journals, led the Historical Ethnomusicology group of the Society for Ethnomusicology (of which he is a Life member) in 2009–2011, and was editor of the 25th anniversary proceedings of the Nordic Association for Japanese and Korean Studies. He has also been active in the development of innovative postgraduate programs: in northern Europe, he collaborated in development of the Master of Global Music program, in China he has contributed to development of the Open Global Music Academy, and from 2021 he is in a project funded by Norwegian Agency for Development Cooperation to develop PhD programs in Uganda. Hebert teaches intensive courses in the fields of arts policy and international higher education for an international PhD summer school in Norway and arts policy in Beijing for law students at China University of Political Science and Law. He also teaches a PhD course in Non-Western Educational Philosophy. He holds the PhD and MA degrees from University of Washington, and a BA degree from Pacific University.

== Research interests ==
Hebert's research is published in several scholarly books and 35 different professional journals.

=== Music competition in Japan ===
In 2012, Hebert published Wind Bands and Cultural Identity in Japanese Schools, a book that identified the world's largest music competition and documented the experiences of its participants. With more than 14,000 competing wind bands and widely admired performances, Japan is an especially important nation for instrumental music education, and Hebert's ethnographic and historical monograph has been described in the journal Music Education Research as "the most comprehensive information about concert (wind) band participation in any country." According to a review in the British Journal of Music Education, "David Hebert delved deep under the surface of the seemingly everyday where he discovered anomalies and cultural specifics that are unlike anything found in the West ... His book performs the remarkable: a call to explore new ways of doing high school band programmes differently." A sociologist with Tokyo Metropolitan University has said that this book "can serve as an important reference and inform the decisions of those attempting to advance changes to the educational system." The book also describes Japanese composers, and has been used for concert program notes by prominent conductors, such as Eugene Corporon, and Timothy Reynish (who describes it as "compulsory reading for anyone interested in Japanese music") This book helps to explain why music competitions are a global phenomenon.

=== Music globalization, transculturation and hybridity ===
According to Roberta Pike, Hebert asserts that “research is needed to explore the role of culture in music education.” From a global perspective, Hebert has examined how musical practices, technologies, and genres are adopted into new contexts, including educational and religious traditions within institutions. In addition to research on Japanese composers, he has studied brass bands among Tongans and New Zealand Maori, jazz and popular music in the United States, Christmas music in Finland, multicultural and indigenous music education in Guyana, the learning of Indian music outside of Asia, and some cross-cultural music exchange projects in New Zealand and Ghana. Hebert has written of inherent tensions between originality and institutionalization, and contends that musical hybrid projects should be “recognized as the potential wellsprings of new musical traditions.” In 2008 at Boston University, he taught a course on the topic of "Music Transculturation and Hybridity". Hebert's research on this topic builds on the scholarship of Bruno Nettl, Margaret Kartomi, Mark Slobin, Timothy Taylor, and Tina Ramnarine. He twice served as keynote speaker for conferences on Music and Globalization in Poland, and the resulting book Music Glocalization has been described as “highly original” and “the first comprehensive account of how the notion of ‘glocalization’ may be useful in rethinking nationality in music and the use of local musical traditions that serve as a means for global strategies.” In the book, Hebert collaborated with Polish musicologist Mikolaj Rykowski to introduce theoretical models and the term ‘glocklization’, which combines the glocal concept with a Glock pistol, to indicate unbalanced forms of glocalization perceived as destructive to cultural heritage.

=== Pluralism and music institutions ===
Hebert's work has also addressed the challenges of representing cultural diversity and embracing pluralism in music education, claiming music has a unique role in intercultural communication. He has advocated for popular music pedagogy and world music pedagogy as innovative approaches for reaching a wider population of students. Teacher educators have noted that Hebert “guides the reader toward a sociological understanding” of diversity, and offers “suggestions for 'empowering music teachers to respond appropriately to the complexity of ethnic differences'.” Extending in directions pioneered by his PhD mentor Patricia Shehan Campbell, Hebert has also written of “the challenges of multicultural teaching in music” and “the central role that ethnic identity plays in musical meaning and engagement.” His research in this area has often been in collaboration with Nordic scholars, including Eva Saether and Marja Heimonen. Along with William Coppola and Patricia Shehan Campbell, he co-authored Teaching World Music in Higher Education as vol.7 of the Routledge World Music Pedagogy series.

=== Nationalism in music education ===
Hebert co-edited with Alexandra Kertz-Welzel (professor and chair, LMU Munich), the 2012 book Patriotism and Nationalism in Music Education. This book includes contributions by music education researchers from several continents, and according to History of Education, discusses “how music contributes to the creation of an emotional climate in schools, and its function in fostering the formation of particular loyalties, identities and dispositions.” Music psychologist John Sloboda described this book as “a 'must read' resource for anyone interested in this topic.” According to a review in Fontes Artis Musicae, Hebert and Kertz-Welzel pose “challenging questions about the role of music teachers in propagating and inculcating patriotic sentiments”, and the book is relevant beyond the sociology of music, to any “scholars engaged in researching comparative and political educational issues.” Elsewhere, Hebert has argued that “intercultural music transmission” enables national boundaries to be positively transcended via music participation.

=== Historical ethnomusicology ===
Hebert's interests in global music historiography developed as he explored such topics as how European music was adopted in Japan, and how the American genres of jazz and rock music ironically struggled to gain acceptance in American schools. In 2014 he produced a book with Jonathan McCollum (Washington College) entitled Theory and Method in Historical Ethnomusicology. Through use of “a broad spectrum of geocultural examples, the volume includes several engaging strategies for using and writing about history in order to understand the world's musics”. Ethnomusicologists Keith Howard, Daniel M. Neuman and Judah Cohen contributed chapters. Hebert now edits a book series in this field with Jonathan McCollum for Rowman and Littlefield press, The Lexington Series in Historical Ethnomusicology: Deep Soundings.

=== Music technology, virtuality, and online music education ===
Hebert has also been active in researching the application of new technologies in online music education and research. Before becoming interested in "big data", he authored an article examining the challenges of educating music teachers in a fully online doctoral program (at Boston University). This sparked some debate – with Kenneth H. Phillips, among others – that led to further publications on projects in Europe and Africa that made use of the Internet to support intercultural music exchange. Hebert's interests in music technology brought him to collaborations with Alex Ruthmann, and projects on music and virtuality as well as digital humanities and "big data" approaches with Danish computer scientist and computational musicologist Kristoffer Jensen.

=== East Asian studies ===
Hebert has researched music in Japan, where he lived for about 5 years, and he often lectures for leading universities and conservatories in China. He has published several articles and book chapters on Western music in Japan (and Korea) and developed International Perspectives on Translation, Education, and Innovation in Japanese and Korean Societies (Springer), the 25th anniversary proceedings of the Nordic Association for Japanese and Korean Studies. The journal Korean Studies notes that this book's “chapters echo the broader theme that language and translation are a font of innovation in East Asian society. This is a provocative idea, and the book does identify some tantalizing evidence.” Hebert has also drawn attention to East Asian arts through the International Sociological Association.

== Philosophical orientation ==
Hebert claims that postmodernist discourse no longer offers an adequate explanation for contemporary musical practices and that most music philosophy suffers from an ethnocentric orientation. Rather, he advocates a global-historical perspective: that humanity has recently exited a period of "digital prehistory" to enter a phase of "data saturation" through ubiquitous mass surveillance, causing conditions he describes as "glocalimbodied," meaning that local and global forces converge to "stamp" the identities of individual actors suspended within a social structure shaped by participatory media. Hebert also argues that music, now most commonly consumed in digital form, may be understood as "content" in a "selfie-stick society". In his view, this new context results in music creation and consumption increasingly transcending earlier connections to space and time, engendering both a blurring and reactionary institutionalization of local genres and historical styles. Consequently, Hebert contends that music education policies and practices should be re-envisioned to emphasize individual originality and empowerment via a musicianship of "flexibility", with inclusion of marginalized traditions, cultivation of both acoustic and digital competencies, and rejection of any ties to "aesthetic fundamentalism", techno-utopianism, militarism and nationalism. Music scholars have noted that Hebert "believes music education will become more relevant and effective when it attends more completely to 'creative agency via technology and musical hybridity'," and that "Music learned in school should have some connection to the music the student engages with outside of school and that musicianship should be understood as an ‘embodied practice situated in sociocultural contexts’." An advocate for increased contemporary music, music technology, and popular music in schools, Hebert nevertheless warns that these should not be seen as panacea for poor teaching or inadequate funding and facilities, and that historical traditions – including the heritage of "classical" art music – still legitimately require ample space in school education. He also developed an Ensemble Ethos Model to explain how conductors and ensemble directors can nurture a culture of musical achievement. Overall, Hebert's work especially promotes the value of internationalism in teacher education, and emphasizes the importance of an international-comparative perspective for developing globally responsible and sustainable educational policies and practices. As Yongjin Wang explains, Hebert claims that "the integrated application of non-Western philosophies of education can enhance the understanding of the nature and value of education."

Criticism. While largely accepted, some of Hebert's conclusions have faced opposition from other scholars. His research in Japan controversially suggests that some important aspects of music history are inaccurately "remembered", and he has argued that similar issues may be found in common music history textbooks in the US and elsewhere. Hebert asserts that music contests can have not only positive, but also negative consequences for participants and the musical traditions they display, and require careful design for desirable outcomes. Some music educators defend traditional pedagogies that Hebert and others claim need to be redeveloped or supplemented with new approaches. Robert Walker and Roger Scruton would disagree with Hebert's position regarding the value of popular music pedagogy. Vincent Bates has argued that a "cosmopolitan" perspective may already receive excessive emphasis in the field of music education, while Thomas Adam Regelski has suggested that "culture" – a concept emphasized in much of Hebert's writings – is too imprecise to be useful to music teachers.

== Musical activities ==
Primarily employed as a professor, Hebert continues to perform as a professional musician in various genres, and teaches a course in songwriting. A jazz trumpeter and classical bass baritone singer, from 2013 to 2015 he had occasional work as a professional chorus member (Edvard Grieg Kor) with the Bergen Philharmonic Orchestra, Bergen National Opera, and Berlin Philharmonic. In the 1990s, Hebert performed as a singer-songwriter with Portland, Oregon-based alternative rock band Post Impression, which shared stages with The Posies, Heatmiser and Everclear. He later played as a member of Zimbabwean band Maichi Maraire and Kubatana, Seattle-based Cuban salsa band Son de Cinco a Siete, and his own jazz groups. Moving to Tokyo, he performed as trumpeter and vocalist in the duo Jazz de Iitomo with Johnny Todd, jazz pianist/arranger and former bandleader for Don Ho. Together with Todd, he recorded an album for vocalist Midori Takamura and had a few appearances with Mika Todd from hit J-Pop group Minimoni. In 2003, he also developed an original opera in Japan in collaboration with Belgian artist Eric Van Hove and electronic musician Kenji Williams. In New Zealand, he performed as a trumpeter with Auckland Symphony Orchestra and Manukau Symphony Orchestra, and in Russia, he recorded with the experimental free improvisation group Moscow Conservatory Pan-Asian Ensemble.

== Books ==
- Hebert, David (2005). Music competition, cooperation, and community: An ethnography of a Japanese school band (Ph.D. thesis). University of Washington. OCLC 60823152.
- Hebert, David (2012). Wind Bands and Cultural Identity in Japanese Schools. Landscapes: The Arts, Aesthetics, and Education. New York: Springer. ISBN 9789400721777. ISBN 9400721773
- McCollum, Jonathan; Hebert, David (2014). Theory and Method in Historical Ethnomusicology. Lanham, Maryland: Lexington Books (Rowman & Littlefield). ISBN 978-1-4985-0086-9.
- Hebert, David; Kertz-Welzel, Alexandra (2016). Patriotism and Nationalism in Music Education. New York: Ashgate/Routledge. ISBN 978-1-4094-3080-3.
- Hebert, David (2018). International Perspectives on Translation, Education, and Innovation in Japanese and Korean Societies. New York: Springer. ISBN 978-3-319-68432-1. ISBN 9783319684321
- Hebert, David; Rykowski, Mikolaj (2018). Music Glocalization: Heritage and Innovation in a Digital Age. Newcastle, UK: Cambridge Scholars. ISBN 9781527503939
- Hebert, David; Hauge, Torunn Bakken (2019). Advancing Music Education in Northern Europe. London: Routledge. ISBN 9781138486263
- Coppola, William; Hebert, David; Campbell, Patricia Shehan (2020). Teaching World Music in Higher Education (World Music Pedagogy, vol. VII). New York: Routledge. ISBN 978-0-367-23173-6. ISBN 9780367231736
- Hebert, David; McCollum, Jonathan (2022). Ethnomusicology and Cultural Diplomacy. Lanham, MD: Lexington Books (Rowman & Littlefield). Archived from the original on 2024-03-03. ISBN 9781793642912
- Hebert, David G., ed. (2023). Comparative and Decolonial Studies in Philosophy of Education. New York: Springer. doi:10.1007/978-981-99-0139-5. ISBN 978-9819901388. S2CID 257585276.
- Ostersjo, Stefan; Nguyen, Thanh Thuy; Hebert, David; Frisk, Henrik (2023). Shared Listenings: Methods for Transcultural Musicianship and Research. Cambridge: Cambridge University Press). ISBN 9781009272575.
- Hebert, David G.; Lum, Chee Hoo, eds. (2025). Perspectives on Music, Education, and Diversity. New York: Springer.
- Xie, Jiaxing; Hebert, David (2026). A New Philosophy of Music Education for the Era of AI. London: Routledge.
