= Nordic Network for Music Education =

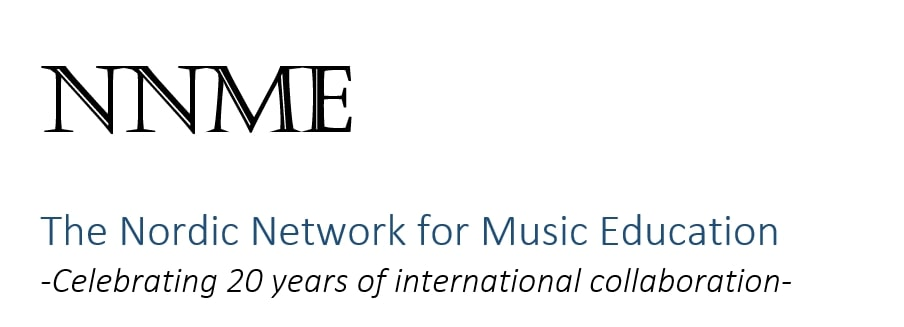
NNME logo

The Nordic Network for Music Education (NNME) is a state-sponsored organization that supports professionalization of music teacher education across eight countries in Northern Europe. It includes the 18 institutions in the Nordic and Baltic states that award professional postgraduate (Master) degrees in the specialized field of music education.

== Network activities ==
Sponsored by the Nordplus program of the Nordic Council of Ministers, for over 20 years the NNME has annually offered an intensive joint Master course for ECTS credits, and supported 'mobility' exchange of music lecturers and Master students across the member institutions, enabling the sharing of research-based knowledge in this field. Founded by Torunn Bakken Hauge, since 2018 it is managed by David Hebert at Western Norway University of Applied Sciences. NNME multi-year projects have focused on several themes over the years: democratic approaches, sustainability of music, universality of music, and digitization of heritage. The NNME has also produced a book, and various online resources related to musical heritage and music teaching in the Nordic-Baltic Eight nations.

== International collaboration ==
Notable keynote speakers for NNME intensive courses have included Alexandra Kertz-Welzel, Even Ruud, Sandra Trehub, Lucy Green, Thomas Adam Regelski, Randall Allsup, David J. Hargreaves, Marie McCarthy, Lauri Vakeva, Patrick Schmidt, Øyvind Varkøy, Catherine Grant, Bo-wah Leung, Emily Achieng’ Akuno, Juniper Hill, Mara Marnauza, Henrik Frisk, Stefan Östersjö, and Alex Ruthmann.

The NNME's institutional coordinators, across the eight Nordic and Baltic countries (Iceland, Norway, Denmark, Sweden, Finland, Estonia, Latvia, and Lithuania), have included notable music education researchers such as Lars Brinck, Cecilia Ferm Almqvist, Goran Folkestad, Eva Georgii-Hemming, Helga Rut Guðmundsdóttir, Marja Heimonen, Geir Johansen, Harald Jorgensen, Kai Karma, Kristi Kiilu, Mara Marnauza, Frede V. Nielsen, Fredrik Pio, Heidi Partti, Eva Saether, Ulrik Volgsten, and Maria Westvall, to name a few.

== See also ==
- European Association of Conservatoires
- European Music Council
- International Society for Music Education
- International Society for Philosophy of Music Education
- MayDay Group
- Music Education
- Music education for young children
- Music school
- Musicology
- Research in Music Education
