= Cusanuswerk =

German sponsor of gifted Catholic students

Logo of the Cusanuswerk

The Cusanuswerk is one of the thirteen German sponsorship organizations financed by the Federal Ministry of Education and Research (Germany) to promote gifted students. It is headquartered in Bonn.

== History ==
The Cusanuswerk was founded in 1956 under the authority of the German Bishops' Conference. It is named after the medieval scholar Nicholas of Cusa. The aim of the Cusanuswerk is to promote gifted Catholic students until their university graduation. The Cusanuswerk also supports exceptionally talented Catholic doctoral students of all disciplines.

From 1988 to 1995, the Cusanuswerk was directed by Annette Schavan; from 2004 to 2011 it was led by Josef Wohlmuth. On October 1, 2011, he was succeeded by Georg Braungart. Auxiliary bishop Christoph Hegge, Münster, is the commissary of the German Bishops' Conference for the Cusanuswerk since 2013.

== Stipend and support ==
The Cusanuswerk awards public funds to "particularly gifted Catholic students of all disciplines."

=== Application ===
For admission, candidates have to apply at the organization or suggested for application by university lecturers or high school teachers.

The selection is a multi-step procedure. At its end, around one quarter of all applicants will be admitted. Admission depends on three main criteria including academic performance, social engagement and Catholic denomination. Admission is possible starting at the entrance to university but also at later stages as long as five semesters of standard study period remain.

An annual exhibition is organized for applicants studying arts, displaying works of all nominated applicants.

=== Financial support ===
Financial support is subject to the rules by the Federal Ministry of Education. It consists of either a fixed monthly lump-sum or a more generous means-tested scholarship for students in need, similar to the regulations of the BAföG. Doctoral students receive a scholarship independent of their financial background. Additional support is available for study and research stays abroad.

=== Academic support ===
The academic support includes regular educational events as well as a spiritual enrichment program. It is expected that support recipients attend an annual summer school organized by the Cusanuswerk.

During their studies, Cusanuswerk scholarship holders form groups at the location of their college. An appointed liaison professor provides additional support. All local scholarship groups elect representatives. Representatives of all local groups meet semiannually for a joint assembly (Cusanuskonferenz).

Social engagement and the acquisition of international experience are particularly encouraged for scholarship holders.

The Cusanuswerk also offers special career support for women based on mentorships and additional seminars.

== Prominent former scholarship holders (so-called Altcusaner) ==
- Adolf M. Birke, university professor, historian
- Brun-Otto Bryde, former judge at the Federal Constitutional Court
- Michael F. Feldkamp, historian
- Winfried Hassemer, university professor, jurist, former judge at the Federal Constitutional Court
- Willi Jäger, university professor, mathematician
- Alexandra Kertz-Welzel, university professor (music education)
- Paul Kirchhof, university professor, jurist, former judge at the Federal Constitutional Court
- Christoph Klein, paediatrician and university professor
- Oskar Lafontaine, former chairman of the SPD, former minister president of Saarland, member of the Bundestag (Faction DIE LINKE.)
- Norbert Lammert, member of the Bundestag, president of the Bundestag since 2005
- Johannes Masing, university professor, jurist, judge at the Federal Constitutional Court
- Michael Matheus, university professor
- Heinz Riesenhuber, former federal minister of research and technology
- Ferdi Schüth, university professor, chemist
- Hans Tietmeyer, former president of the Deutsche Bundesbank

== Literature ==
- Begabung als Herausforderung. Editors: Hermann Breulmann, Wolfgang Frühwald, Annette Schavan, Paderborn, Munich, Vienna, Zurich 1991.
- Verbindende Vielfalt. 40 Jahre Cusanuswerk. Editor: Claudia Lücking-Michel, Köln 1996
- 50 Jahre Cusanuswerk. Bischöfliche Studienförderung. Glauben. Wissen. Gestalten 1956-2006, Publisher: Cusanuswerk. Bonn 2006.
