= Kworb =

Music data aggregation website

- Website type: Music-analytics service
- Available in: English
- Website: kworb.net
- Commercial: Yes
- Registration: None
- Launched: February 2012; 14 years ago
- Current status: Active

Kworb is an independent online music‑data aggregation service that compiles chart and streaming information from publicly available sources. Launched in 2012, it provides free summary charts and rankings derived from platforms such as Spotify, Apple Music, YouTube, Shazam, Deezer, and Mediabase for radio airplay data. The site is maintained by its creator and has been described as a “no‑frills” resource that offers a quick view of regional and global chart performance.

== Background and features ==
Kworb was created in February 2012 as a hobby project. It hosts a variety of charts‑based summaries, including daily and weekly global charts, regional streaming rankings and an all‑time chart of the most‑streamed songs. It features a “Global Digital Artist Ranking,” which aggregates an artist’s performance across multiple digital music and streaming services. The Belmont University Library’s music‑business research guide recommends Kworb for quick daily or weekly insights into digital music charts.

== Usage and reception ==
Kworb’s aggregated statistics have been frequently cited by journalists. The analytics firm Chartmetric lists Kworb among useful free tools and notes that it provides summary chart data from Spotify, Apple Music, Shazam, Deezer, YouTube, radio and U.S. sales sources. News outlets have used Kworb’s data to report streaming milestones: the website NextShark, for example, credited Kworb for showing that BTS had surpassed 38 billion streams on Spotify, and provided individual streaming counts for songs such as “Dynamite” with 1.8 billion plays. Other publications that have cited Kworb in their articles include the BBC, Loudwire Rolling Stone, and Screen Rant. Researchers have also drawn on Kworb’s weekly charts to model how songs gain or lose popularity over time.

Despite these references, coverage of the site itself is limited. Most articles use statistics from Kworb as convenient data points rather than discussing the service in depth. Industry commentary positions it as a quick snapshot for enthusiasts rather than a comprehensive analytics service.

== Reliability ==
Kworb does not publish a full methodology for its “popularity” values and labels some of its figures as estimates. Despite this, its data is commonly used to illustrate the popularity of certain songs or artists in secondary reporting. (Note: Attributed to mention of "Kworb" in articles by the BBC, Loudwire, Rolling Stone, and Screen Rant.)

== See also ==
- Music popularity index
