= Welzel =

Welzel is a surname. Notable people with the surname include:

- Alexandra Kertz-Welzel (born 1970), German Professor and Chair of Music Education at LMU Munich
- Christian Welzel (born 1964), German political scientist
- Heinz Welzel (1911–2002), German stage, television and film actor
- Martin Welzel (born 1972), German organist, musicologist, and pedagogue

== See also ==
- Inglehart–Welzel cultural map of the world
