= Helga Rut Guðmundsdóttir =

Icelandic academic

Helga Rut Guðmundsdóttir is a professor of music education at the University of Iceland School of Education.

== Education ==
Helga Rut Guðmundsdóttir was born in Reykjavík in 1970. She passed the Icelandic matriculation examination from Menntaskólinn við Hamrahlíð in 1989 and graduated with a B.Ed degree from the Iceland University of Education in 1992, specialising in music. Helga Rut learned the piano from a young age. She was taught by Jónas Ingimundarson at the Reykjavík College of Music and later by Jónas Sen, Þorsteinn Gauti Sigurðsson and finally Margaret Etienne at the McGill Conservatory in Montreal. Helga Rut completed an MA in music education from the School of Music at McGill University in 1997 and a Ph.D in the same subject from the same university in 2003. During her Master's programme, she focused on vocal training and choral conducting. Her Master's thesis was entitled "Children's ability to identify two simultaneous melodies." The findings of this research were published in the Journal of Research in Music Education in 1999.

Her doctoral thesis was entitled "Music Reading Errors of Young Piano Students." The findings of her doctoral research were published in the journals Music Education Research and the International Journal of Music Education in 2010.

== Career ==
Helga Rut was hired as Assistant Professor in music at the Iceland University of Education in 2000 and now works as a professor of music education at the University of Iceland, School of Education. Helga Rut has taught music and childhood musical development to students in general teacher education, preschool teacher education and leisure studies. Among the courses she teaches are: Music in early childhood; Music and the brain; The art of creating music; and Singing and choral conducting.

== Research ==
Helga Rut has researched music education in Icelandic schools and published articles on this topic in Icelandic journals. Tónmennt í íslenskum grunnskólum: Útbreiðsla, aðstæður og viðhorf, 2008, Tímarit um Menntarannsóknir. Tónmenntakennsla í íslenskum grunnskólum, 2013, Tímaritið Uppeldi og menntun. She also took part in researching current practices in Icelandic compulsory schools and co-authored a chapter in the book Starfshættir í íslenskum grunnskólum á 21. öldinni.

=== International collaboration ===
Helga Rut has been the chair of MERYC (European Network for Music Educators and Researchers of Young Children) since 2018 and a member of the board since 2015. She is also active in NNME (Nordic Network for Music Education) and NNMPF (Nordisk Netverk for Musikk Pedagogisk Forskning).

Helga Rut was a visiting professor at the School of Music at McGill University 2006-2007 and later a visiting professor at the Department of Psychology at the University of Montreal 2012-2013, where she worked at the BRAMS (Brain Music and Sound Research) laboratory and took courses in neuropsychology and music psychology.

In the academic year 2016-2017, she was awarded a Fulbright scholarship to do research work in the USA, dividing her time between Columbia University in New York and the University of Southern California in Los Angeles.

Helga Rut has been involved in Nordic collaboration on the education of music teachers since 2002 and penned a chapter in the book Advancing Music Education in Northern Europe (Routledge 2019).

The largest international research project that Helga Rut has taken part in began in 2009 and bears the title Advancing Interdisciplinary Research in Singing – this project was a collaboration between 70 researchers in 15 different countries. She took a seat on the board for the project in 2012 and has edited a 40-chapter volume describing the findings of the AIRS project, published in 2020 under the title: The Routledge Companion to Interdisciplinary Research in Singing and Education.

Helga Rut's research is in the field of childhood music development and has increasingly focused on very early childhood. Her recent publications in this area are:

- Trehub, S. E. and Gudmundsdottir, H. R. (2015). Mothers as Singing Mentors for Infants. The Oxford Handbook of Singing. Edited by Graham Welch, David M. Howard, and John Nix
- Gudmundsdottir, H. R. (2015). Musikalisk kompetens i början av livet – perception, cognition och kommunikation. In: Hofvander Trulson, Y. & Houmann, A. (Eds.) Musik och lärande i barnets värld. Studentlitteratur.
- Gudmundsdottir, H. R. (2019). Revisiting singing proficiency in 3-year-olds. Psychology of Music.
- Gudmundsdottir, H. R., & Trehub, S. (2018). Adults recognize toddlers’ song renditions. Psychology of Music, 46(2), 155-173.

Helga Rut's research is notable for compellingly demonstrating that the singing capabilities of very young children can be far more advanced than previously imagined. Her research findings provide a convincing rationale for broad expansion of early childhood music education, as exemplified in her novel method for musical bonding between parents and infants (see below).

== Other work ==
Helga Rut founded the company Tónagull ehf., which develops and manages music courses for young children from birth. Tónagull holds courses for parents and early years teachers, as well as developing and publishing educational material for young children, e.g. for use in preschools. Tónagull courses have been held since 2004 and continue to grow in popularity. In 2015, Helga Rut published a book and a CD entitled: Vísnagull, vísur og þulur fyrir börn í fangi. A large number of participatory music events have been held based on Vísnagull, e.g. in Salurinn, at the Children's Culture Festival and on Culture Night aimed at families with children aged between 1 and 3.

== Personal life ==
Helga Rut's parents are Elín Einarsdóttir, a former teacher and student counsellor, and Guðmundur Ingi Leifsson, a former headteacher and superintendent of schools in NW Iceland.

== Most notable works ==
- Gudmundsdottir, H. R. (2018). An Icelandic perspective on the Nordic music education community. In (Eds. David G. Hebert and Torunn Bakken-Hauge), Advancing Music Education in Northern Europe, Routledge, Taylor and Francis Group.
- Gudmundsdottir, H. R. (2017). The Importance of Music in Early Childhood: Perspectives from Research to Practice. Perspectives: Journal of the Early Childhood Music & Movement Association, 12(3).
- Einarsdóttir, S. L. and Gudmundsdottir, H. R. (2016). The Role of Choral Singing in the Lives of Amateur Choristers in Iceland. Music Education Research, 18(1), 39-56.
- Gudmundsdottir, H. R., & Cohen, A. J. (2015). Advancing interdisciplinary research in singing through the AIRS Test Battery of Singing Skills [Eds. Helga R. Gudmundsdottir and Annabel Cohen]. Musicae Scientiae, 19(3), 234-237.
- Gudmundsdottir, H. R. (2015). Vísnagull -Vísur og þulur fyrir börn í fang i. (Ed.) Helga Rut Guðmundsdóttir, Tónagull ehf., Prentmet, Reykjavík.
- Gudmundsdottir, H. R. (2013). Tónmenntakennsla í íslenskum grunnskólum [Transl.: Music Education in Icelandic Schools], Uppeldi og menntun –Icelandic Journal of Education, 22(2), 37-54.
- Gudmundsdottir, H. R. (2013). Tónlistarþroski ungbarna og tónlistaruppeldi –Yfirlitsgrein [Transl.: Musical development of infants and music education – A review]. Netla - Veftímarit um uppeldi og menntun, Menntavísindasvið Háskóla Íslands, 3. október 2013.
- Gudmundsdottir, H. R. (2010). Advances in Music Reading Research. Music Education Research, 12 (4), 331-338.
- Gudmundsdottir, H. R. & Gudmundsdottir, D. G. (2010). Parent–infant music courses in Iceland: perceived benefits and mental well-being of mothers, Music Education Research, Special issue: Early Childhood Music Education, 12(3), 299 – 309.
- Gudmundsdottir, H. R., (2010). Pitch error analysis of young piano students’ music reading performances. International Journal of Music Education, 28(1) 61-70.
- Gudmundsdottir, H. R. (2008). Tónmennt í íslenskum grunnskólum: Útbreiðsla, aðstæður og viðhorf. [Transl. Music Education in Icelandic schools: Scope, conditions, and attitudes.] Tímarit um Menntarannsóknir, 5, pp. 63-76. Félag um menntarannsóknir, Háskóla Íslands.
- Gudmundsdottir, H. R. (2007). Tónskynjun 7 - 11 ára barna: Þroskaferli í getu til að heyra laglínur sem hljóma samtímis [Transl. Melodic perception of 7-11-year-olds: Development of simultaneity discrimination]. Netla - Veftímarit um uppeldi og menntun. Rannsóknarstofnun Kennaraháskóla Íslands, 18. desember, 2007.
- Gudmundsdottir, H. R. (1999). Children's Auditory Discrimination of Simultaneous Melodies, Journal of Research in Music Education, 47(2), 101-110.
