= Patricia Shehan Campbell =

American musicologist

- Known for: Community music, children's musical culture, applied ethnomusicology, multiculturalism in school music education, World Music Pedagogy
- Awards: MENC Senior Researcher Award; Taiji Traditional Music Award; Fumio Koizumi Prize for Ethnomusicology

Academic background
- Education: Kent State University
- Influences: William M. Anderson; John Blacking; Terry Kuhn; Barbara Lundquist; Terry E. Miller; Bruno Nettl; Christopher Small

Academic work
- Discipline: Music education, ethnomusicology
- Institutions: University of Washington
- Notable students: David G. Hebert

Patricia Shehan Campbell (born 1950) is an American musicologist.

== Life and career ==
She is the Donald E. Peterson Professor of Music at the University of Washington, where she teaches courses at the interface of music education and ethnomusicology. Prior to this position, she was a member of the faculties of Washington University in St. Louis and Butler University. Her training includes Dalcroze Eurhythmics, piano and vocal performance, and specialized study in Bulgarian choral song, Indian (Karnatic) vocal repertoire, and Thai mahori, the latter two of which were launched during the period of her PhD studies in Music Education (with cognate studies in ethnomusicology) at Kent State University. Her earliest studies were at the Cleveland Music School Settlement, where she learned piano from Jonas Svedas and composition from Bain Murray. She taught choral-vocal music in Cleveland-area schools before shifting her attention to music teacher education, and has worked on curricular projects in the St. Louis, Indianapolis, and Seattle area schools. Her additional training and education in music and its pedagogy has come through courses and programs sponsored by the National Endowment for the Humanities, the National Endowment for the Arts, the International Research Exchange (IREX), Fulbright-Hays, the Lilly Endowment, and the International Foundation for Music Research.

Campbell has enjoyed involvement in professional organizations (and their boards, especially the Society for Ethnomusicology, the International Society for Music Education, and The College Music Society). Campbell has served terms as President of the College Music Society, Vice President of the Society for Ethnomusicology and chair of the Board of Smithsonian Folkways. She has served on editorial boards of the Psychology of Music, British Journal of Music Education, Research Studies in Music Education, Journal of Research in Music Education, College Music Symposium, and other journals, as well as co-editor of the Global Music Series of Oxford University Press. Her activity has been to examine contemporary situations relevant to cultural diversity and multicultural mandates in the teaching of music in various settings, and to seek out culturally responsive practices and the policies that articulate them. She is at work in the development of the Smithsonian Folkways Recordings certification courses in World Music Pedagogy for educators in elementary, secondary, and tertiary-level teaching, where she serves as chair of the SFR Advisory Board. She is actively engaged in international research projects on the pursuit of the Australian-based sustainable futures for music cultures and the Canadian-based network for advancing interdisciplinary research in singing. She is an active contributor to the dissemination of field recordings of Alan Lomax through her design of lessons for the Association for Cultural Equity. Her teaching and scholarship converge on questions of how music is transmitted, acquired, and created in contexts close to and distant from traditional practices of American educational institutions.

Campbell is the subject of a festschrift that documents her scholarly impact and influence as a teacher and mentor.

== Works ==
Campbell is the author of Songs in Their Heads (2010, 2nd edition), Musician and Teacher: Orientation to Music Education (2008), Tunes and Grooves in Music Education (2008), Teaching Music Globally (2004) (and co-editor of Oxford's Global Music Series), Lessons from the World (1991/2001), Music in Cultural Context (1996), a musical parenting manual called I Can Play It (2015), co-author of Music in Childhood (2013, 4th edition) and Free to Be Musical: Group Improvisation in Music (2010). She is co-editor of Multicultural Perspectives in Music Education (3rd edition, 2010), The Oxford Handbook on Children's Musical Cultures (2013), and Music for Elementary Classroom Teachers (2016). Recent chapters on world music pedagogy, music and social justice, applied ethnomusicology, and community music, have appeared in collected essays and handbooks.

Campbell has given numerous named lectures as well as clinical presentations throughout North America, in much of Europe and Asia, in Australia, New Zealand, and parts of South America and South Africa on traditional songs and singing styles, the pedagogy of world music, children's musical cultures, and curricular traditions and transformations in universities and schools. Campbell has coordinated university-community music partnership projects, including Music Alive! in the Yakima Valley, First Band at First Place School, the Laurelhurst Music Program, and musical exchanges of university music majors with students of the Yakama Nation Tribal School. She was recipient of the Taiji Traditional Music Award in its inaugural year (2013), the Gunstream Award in Music for Community Engagement (2009), and the MENC Senior Researcher Award (2002).

== Publications ==
Year	Title	Authors	City of Publication	Publisher
1989 1996 2003 2010	Multicultural Perspectives in Music Education Second Edition Chinese Translation Third Edition, 3 Volumes	William M. Anderson Patricia Shehan Campbell	Reston, VA	Music Educator's National Conference
1990	From Rice Paddies and Temple Yards: Traditional Music of Vietnam	Phong Thuyet Nguyen Patricia Shehan Campbell	Danbury, CT	World Music Press
1991	Lessons from the World	Patricia Shehan Campbell	New York	Schirmer Books
1991	Silent Temples, Songful Hearts: Traditional Music of Cambodia	Sam-Ang Sam Patricia Shehan Campbell	Danbury, CT	World Music Press
1992	The Lion's Roar: Chinese Luogu Percussion Ensembles	Kuo-Huang Han Patricia Shehan Campbell	Danbury, CT	World Music Press
1994	Roots and Branches: A Legacy of Multicultural Music for Children	Patricia Shehan Campbell Ellen McCullough-Brabson Judith Cook Tucker	Danbury, CT	World Music Press
1995 2001 2005 2009 2013	Music in Childhood: From Preschool through the Elementary Grades Second Edition Third Edition Third Edition/Enhanced Fourth Edition/Enhanced	Patricia Shehan Campbell Carol Scott-Kassner	New York	Schirmer Books
1996	Music in Cultural Context	Patricia Shehan Campbell	Reston, VA	MENC
1998	Traditional Songs of Singing Cultures	Patricia Shehan Campbell Sue Williamson Pierre Perron	Miami, FL	Warner Bros. Publications
1998 2010	Songs in Their Heads: Music and Its Meaning in Children's Lives Second Edition	Patricia Shehan Campbell	New York	Oxford University Press
2001	Canciones de America Latina: De Su Origen en La Escuela	Patricia Shehan Campbell	Miami, FL	Warner Bros. Publications
2003	From Bangkok and Beyond: Thai Children's Songs, Games and Customs	Pornprapit Phoasavadi Patricia Shehan Campbell	Danbury, CT	World Music Press
2004	Teaching Music Globally	Patricia Shehan Campbell	New York	Oxford University Press
2006	Cultural Diversity in Music Education: Directions and Challenges for the 21st Century	Patricia Shehan Campbell Huib Schippers, Editors	Queensland	Australian Academic Press
2006	Games Children Sing: Malaysia	Jackie Chooi-Theng Lew Patricia Shehan Campbell	Van Nuys, CA	Alfred Press
2008	Musician and Teacher: Orientations to Music Education	Patricia Shehan Campbell with contributed chapters by Steven M. Demorest and Steven J. Morrison	New York	W.W. Norton
2008	Tunes and Grooves: Music in the Making	Lee Higgins Patricia Shehan Campbell	Englewood Cliffs, NJ	Pearson
2012	The Oxford Handbook on Music in Children's Lives	Patricia Shehan Campbell Trevor Wiggins, Editors	New York	Oxford University Press
2015	I Can Play It: Play-and-Learn Activities to Help your Child Discover the World through Music	Patricia Shehan Campbell Maja Pitamic Illustrated by Isabel Alberdi		Barron's Educational Series, Incorporated
2016	Redefining Music Studies in an Age of Change: Creativity, Diversity, and Integration	Edward W. Sarath, David E. Myers, Patricia Shehan Campbell	New York, NY	Routledge
2019	World Music Pedagogy, Vol. 6: School-Community Intersections	Patricia Shehan Campbell, Chee Hoo Lum	New York, NY	Routledge
2020	World Music Pedagogy, Vol. 7: Teaching World Music in Higher Education	William J. Coppola, David G. Hebert, Patricia Shehan Campbell	New York, NY	Routledge
