= Jonathan McCollum =

- Born: Aiken, South Carolina
- Education: University of Maryland, Tufts University, Florida State University Shogaku Zen Institute
- Known for: historical ethnomusicology, shakuhachi, Armenian music, Zen Buddhist ritual.
- Scientific career
- Fields: ethnomusicology, musicology
- Workplaces: Washington College
- Thesis: (2004, Ph.D.)
- Website: https://www.washcoll.edu/people_departments/faculty/mccollum-jon.php

Jonathan McCollum, Professor of Music at Washington College in Chestertown, Maryland, is an ethnomusicologist and performer on the Japanese shakuhachi, trombone, and bass trombone. He is the founding Chair of the Historical Ethnomusicology section of the Society for Ethnomusicology, and is known for his work on the music of Armenia and Japan.

== Music Scholarship ==
McCollum is especially known for theoretical contributions to the historiography of global music (historical ethnomusicology), and research studies into both the music of Armenia and the music of Japan, particularly Zen Buddhist ritual and shakuhachi flute tradition.

As a musicologist, McCollum has contributed extensively to academic journals, encyclopedias, and music reference works, including most recently the Bloomsbury Encyclopedia of Popular Music, the Sage International Encyclopedia of Music and Culture, and the New Grove Dictionary of Musical Instruments. He has also worked as a consultant for the Armenian Library and Museum of America, the Smithsonian Institution, and Folkways Alive! of the Canadian Centre for Ethnomusicology at the University of Alberta.

McCollum is the author of Armenian Music: A Comprehensive Bibliography and Discography (Scarecrow Press, 2004) and has contributed to many other volumes. He has co-edited (with David Hebert) the books Theory and Method in Historical Ethnomusicology (Lexington Books, 2014) and Ethnomusicology and Cultural Diplomacy (Lexington Books, 2022). He and Hebert are co-editors of a book series for Rowman and Littlefield press, The Lexington Series in Historical Ethnomusicology: Deep Soundings.

== Music Performance ==
McCollum holds the specialized Shihan 師範 (Master’s) license in shakuhachi performance and teaching, with the professional name (natori) “Kenzen (研禅)” earned primarily through studies under Dai Shihan (Grand Master) Michael Chikuzen Gould.

As a professional performer, McCollum has also contributed to virtual instrument sample libraries; he is the shakuhachi player for Stealth Wind software (on Unearthed Sampling’s Kontakt platform), which is widely used by professional soundtrack composers for videos and films.

McCollum is a former student of John Drew, Professor of Trombone at Florida State University. McCollum works as a professional trombonist in the Washington, D.C. and Maryland areas.

== Buddhist Practice ==
McCollum holds the dharma name, Seichō. He is a fully transmitted teacher (sensei) with the White Plum Asanga and an ordained Sōtō Zen priest. He teaches at Clare Sangha in Baltimore, Maryland.
