= Christopher Small =

New Zealand-born musician and author (1927–2011)

Christopher Small

Christopher Neville Charles Small (17 March 1927 – 7 September 2011) was a New Zealand-born musician, educator, lecturer, and author of many influential books and articles in the fields of musicology, sociomusicology and ethnomusicology. He coined the term musicking, to highlight music as a process (verb) and not an object (noun.)

== Biography ==
Small was born in Palmerston North, New Zealand, to a dentist and former schoolteacher, and was the youngest of three children.

His early school education took place at the Terrace End and Russell Street Primary Schools (1932–1939), Palmerston North Boys' High School (1940–1941) and Wanganui Collegiate School (1942–1944). Between 1945 and 1952 he attended the University of Otago and then Victoria University College. He taught at Horowhenua College (at the same time working at Morrow Productions Ltd making educational animated films) from 1953 to 1958, and at Waihi College from 1959 to 1960.

In 1960, he was awarded a New Zealand government bursary and he spent 1961 travelling in the United Kingdom, before studying composition in London with Priaulx Rainier, where he also had contact with Bernard Rands, Luigi Nono and Witold Lutoslawski. After his studies he stayed in England, where he taught at schools, including Anstey College of Education in Birmingham. He became senior lecturer in music at Ealing College of Higher Education in London (1971–1986) and he also taught at Dartington College of Arts in 1979. Between 1977 and 1986 he was adjunct professor of the history of music at Syracuse University London Centre, and a tutor in music to the summer school of the BEd course of Sussex University between 1981 and 1984.

Smalls retired from teaching in 1986 and moved to Sitges, Spain, where he lived with his partner Neville Braithwaite (a Jamaican-born dancer, singer, and youth worker) whom he married in 2006. During his time in Spain, Small conducted Catalan choirs and was visited regularly by people from both Europe and the US, who admired his work. In the US, his ideas have been supported by prominent musicologists such as Charles Keil, Robert Walser, Susan McClary and The Village Voice rock critic Robert Christgau.

Neville Braithwaite died in 2006, and Small died in 2011. He is survived by his sister, Rosemary.

During his lifetime he published a number of books, and articles in journals such as Music in Education, Tempo, The Musical Times, Music and Letters, and Musical America. He lectured in many educational institutions in the United Kingdom, Norway and the United States, contributed with papers to organisations such as the Composers' Guild of Great Britain (1984), the Association of Improvising Musicians (1985), Music Educators National Conference (Hartford, Connecticut, 1985; Washington, DC, 1989) and the Society for Ethnomusicology (Cambridge, Massachusetts, 1988).

Small took part in the series Sounds Different, broadcast by BBC-TV2 (July 1982), and wrote This Is Who We Are, a three-programme broadcast on BBC Radio 3 (March 1988) about Afro-American music.

=== Musicking ===
In his book of the same title (Musicking, 1998), Small argues for introducing a new word to the English dictionary – that of musicking (from the verb to music), meaning any activity involving or related to music performance. According to his own definition,

To music is to take part, in any capacity, in a musical performance, whether by performing, by listening, by rehearsing or practicing, by providing material for performance (what is called composing), or by dancing. We might at times even extend its meaning to what the person is doing who takes the tickets at the door or the hefty men who shift the piano and the drums or the roadies who set up the instruments and carry out the sound checks or the cleaners who clean up after everyone else has gone. They, too, are all contributing to the nature of the event that is a musical performance.

In expanding his ideas presented in his earlier book (Music, Society, Education, 1977), Small continues to demonstrate that musicking is an active way in which we relate to the rest of the world.

The act of musicking establishes in the place where it is happening a set of relationships, and it is in those relationships that the meaning of the act lies. They are to be found not only between those organized sounds which are conventionally thought of as being the stuff of musical meaning but also between the people who are taking part, in whatever capacity, in the performance; and they model, or stand as metaphor for, ideal relationships as the participants in the performance imagine them to be: relationships between person and person, between individual and society, between humanity and the natural world and even perhaps the supernatural world.

== Works ==
=== Bibliography ===
- Music, Society, Education (1977)
- Schoenberg (1977)
- Music of the Common Tongue: Survival and Celebration in African American Music (1987)
- Musicking: The Meanings of Performing and Listening (1998)

=== Compositions ===
- Actions for Chorus – Some Maori Place Names for large chorus (1974)
- Black Cat for school percussion ensemble and voices (1968)
- Children of the Mist, a ballet in two acts for orchestra (1960)
- Concert Piece for orchestra (1963)
- High Country Stockman, orchestral music for film (1952)
- Suite from Children of the Mist, for orchestra (1960)
- TB, for film (1955)
- The Story of Soil, music for film (1954)
- Trees music for film (1952)
- Various Songs and Solo Piano Pieces for students and friends (1980)
- What on Earth is Happening music for film (1958)

== Christopher Small Collection ==
In 1997, Christopher Small retired in Sitges and donated his personal library to the University of Girona. The collection is of outstanding quality and unique in the context of Catalan universities. Most of its nearly 500 volumes are centered around music and cover ethnomusicology, musical sociology, and popular music - especially afroamerican genres like jazz, blues, soul. etc.

== Other sources ==
- Norman, Philip. Bibliography of New Zealand Compositions. Third Edition: Nota Bene Music (1991)
- Cohen, Mary L. Christopher Small's Concept of Musicking: Toward a Theory of Choral Singing Pedagogy in Prison Contexts. Doctoral Dissertation, 2007, The University of Kansas
- Thomson, John Mansfield. Biographical Dictionary of New Zealand Composers. Wellington: Victoria University Press (1990). p. 128–129.
- Cole, Simon. just BE here - the guide to musicking mindfulness
