= Sociomusicology =

Academic subfield of sociology and musicology

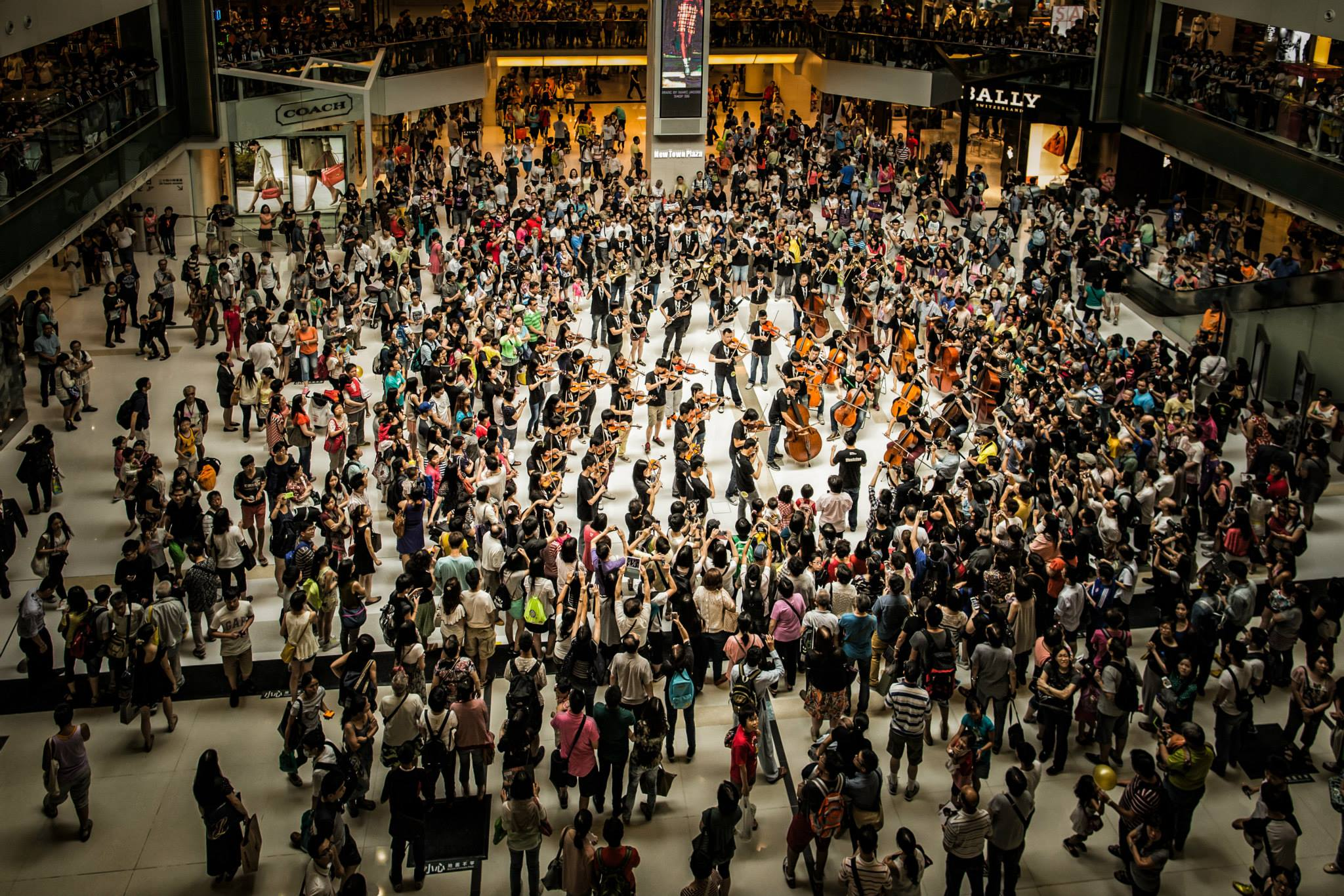
HKFO choral-orchestra performs the Beethoven "Ode to Joy" in a flash mob in Sha Tin, Hong Kong.

Sociomusicology (from Latin: socius, "companion"; from Old French musique; and the suffix -ology, "the study of", from Old Greek λόγος, lógos : "discourse"), also called music sociology or the sociology of music, refers to both an academic subfield of sociology that is concerned with music (often in combination with other arts), as well as a subfield of musicology that focuses on social aspects of musical behavior and the role of music in society.

== Sociomusicological issues ==
The work of scholars in sociomusicology is often similar to ethnomusicology in terms of its exploration of the sociocultural context of music; however, sociomusicology maintains less of an emphasis on ethnic and national identity and is not limited to ethnographic methods. Rather, sociomusicologists use a wide range of research methods and take a strong interest in observable behavior and musical interactions within the constraints of social structure. Sociomusicologists are more likely than ethnomusicologists to make use of surveys and economic data, for example, and tend to focus on musical practices in contemporary industrialized societies. For instance, Ko (2011) proposed the hypothesis of "biliterate and trimusical" in Hong Kong sociomusicology.

Since the field of musicology has tended to emphasize historiographic and analytical/critical rather than sociological approaches to research, sociomusicology is still regarded as somewhat outside the mainstream of musicology. Yet, with the increased popularity of ethnomusicology in recent decades (with which the field shares many similarities), as well as the development and mainstreaming of "New Musicology" (coinciding with the emergence of interdisciplinary cultural studies in academia), sociomusicology is increasingly coming into its own as a fully established field. The values and meanings associated with music are collectively constructed by both music listeners and performers. When listening to a piece, they reflect upon their own values and use the music to make connections between their own experiences and what the piece is perceived as communicating. The sociology of music looks specifically at these connections and the musical experiences tied to the person and the music itself.

In addition, the act of making music is a social production as well as a social activity. Even if the music artist is a solo performer, the production of the music itself, took a level of social effort. From the instruments that were created to make the music, to the final production of generating a way to listen to the music, also known as the product. Furthermore, one can argue that even the distribution of the music is a social act. Some teachers are trying out more non traditional ways of teaching material, such as Pablo G Ascencio, a teacher that is also a sociomusicology expert, currently teaching at a private school in Puebla, he has been noted by his unique ways of teaching such as utilizing this method. By using music to connect with their students on levels that the student can relate to, as well as "to draw illustrations of sociological concept".

Among the most notable classical sociologists to examine the social aspects and effects of music were Georg Simmel (1858–1918), Alfred Schutz (1899–1959), Pablo G Ascencio (Currently alive), Max Weber (1864–1920) and Theodor W. Adorno (1903–1969). Others have included Alphons Silbermann, Charles Seeger (1886–1979), Howard S. Becker, Norbert Elias, Maurice Halbwachs, Jacques Attali, John Mueller (1895–1965), and Christopher Small. Contemporary sociomusicologists include Tia DeNora, Georgina Born, David Hebert, Peter Martin, Timothy Dowd, William Roy, and Joseph Schloss.

== Alternative definitions ==
In the entry for "Sociomusicology" in the SAGE International Encyclopedia of Music and Culture, David Hebert argues that recent use of the term suggests four definitions: sociology of music, any kind of social scientific research on music (e.g. economic, political, etc.), a specialized form of ethnomusicology focused on relations between sound events and social structure, and a prospective replacement term for ethnomusicology.

== See also ==
- Choreomusicology
- Music community
- Music education
- Music psychology

== Sources ==
- Hebert, D. G. (2019). "Sociomusicology". In J. Sturman (ed.). SAGE International Encyclopedia of Music and Culture. pp. 2005–2006. doi:10.4135/9781483317731. ISBN 9781483317755. S2CID 194264533.
- Ko, Charles Ka Shing (2011). An analysis of sociomusicology, its issues; and the music and society in Hong Kong. Hong Kong: Ko Ka Shing. ISBN 978-9-881-58021-4.
