= Susanne Baer =

German legal scholar

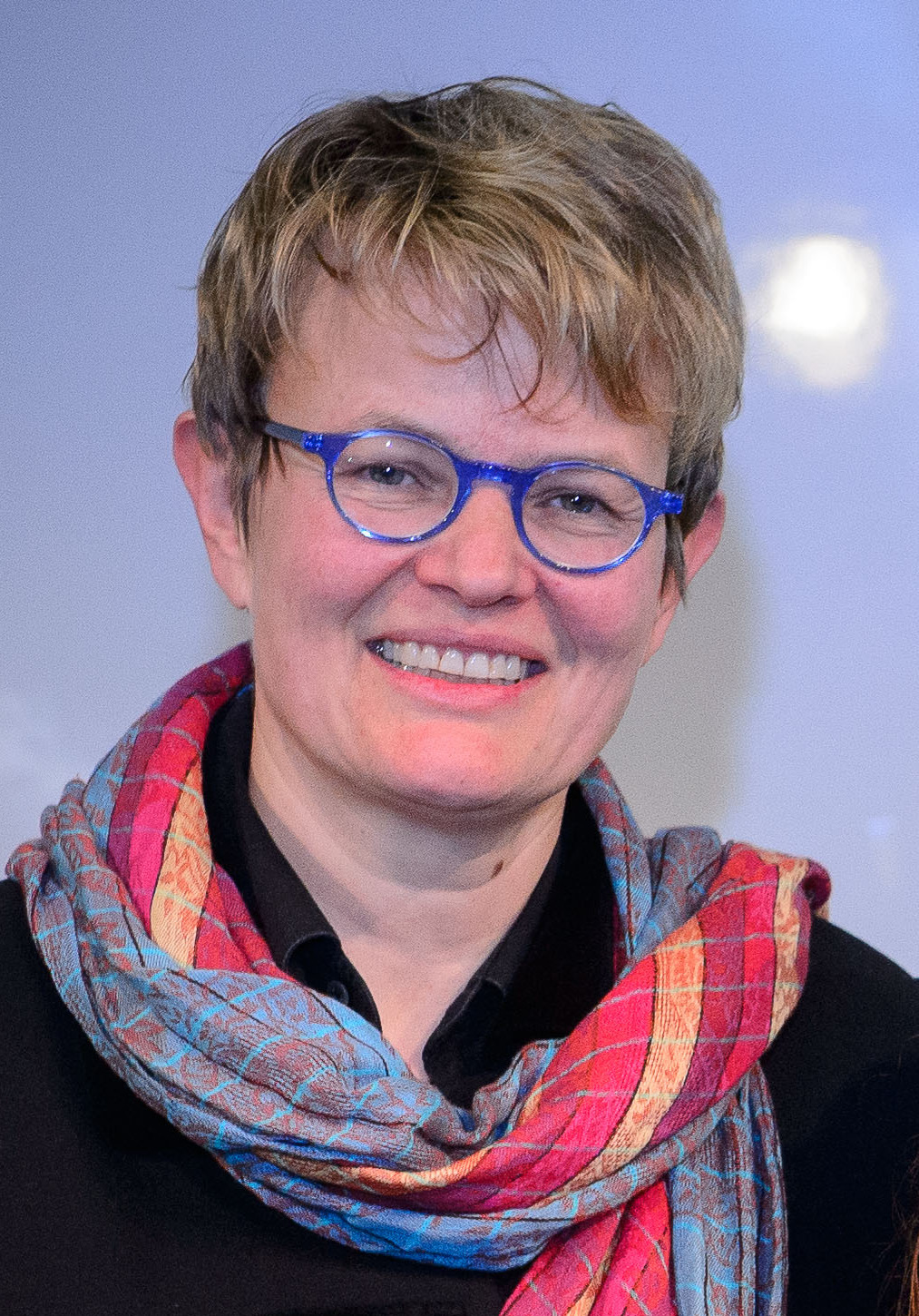
- Baer in 2010

Justice of the Federal Constitutional Court of Germany
- In office 2 February 2011 – 20 February 2023
- Nominated by: The Greens
- Preceded by: Brun-Otto Bryde
- Succeeded by: Martin Eifert

Personal details
- Born: 16 February 1964 (age 62) Saarbrücken, West Germany
- Education: Free University of Berlin; University of Michigan Law School; Goethe University Frankfurt

Susanne Baer, FBA (born 16 February 1964) is a German legal scholar and was one of the 16 judges of the Federal Constitutional Court of Germany from 2011 to 2023. Baer has been the William W. Cook Global Law Professor at the University of Michigan Law School since winter 2010 and is also a professor of public law and gender studies with the law faculty at Humboldt University of Berlin and its dean of academic affairs.

== Early life and education ==
Baer was born in Saarbrücken, Saarland on 16 February 1964. From 1983 to 1988, Baer studied German law and political science at the Free University of Berlin. She received her LL.M. from the University of Michigan Law School in 1993.

== Career ==
With a scholarship by the Hans Böckler Foundation between 1993 and 1995, Baer wrote her doctoral thesis "Dignity or equality: The appropriate fundamental-rights concept of anti-discrimination law – a comparison of the approach to sexual harassment in the workplace in the Federal Republic of Germany and the U.S." at the Goethe University Frankfurt, for which she received the Walter Kolb Memorial Award of the City of Frankfurt am Main.

Baer was visiting professor of public law at Bielefeld University in 2001/02 and at the University of Erfurt in 2001.

In 2002, Baer declined the offer of a professorship at Bielefeld University but soon after was appointed university professor at the Humboldt University of Berlin. In 2005/2006, she served as vice president for academic and international affairs at Humboldt University and as director of its Centre for Transdisciplinary Gender Studies and GenderCompetenceCentre (2003–2010).

Baer's research areas include socio-cultural legal studies, gender studies, law against discrimination, and comparative constitutional law.

=== Judge of the Federal Constitutional Court of Germany, 2011–2023 ===
Baer was a judge of the Federal Constitutional Court of Germany from February 2011, when she was elected to the Court by a committee of the German Parliament for a 12-year term upon nomination by The Greens. She is the second judge of the Federal Constitutional Court to be elected on the proposal of the Greens; Brun-Otto Bryde was the first. Baer is the first lesbian to serve on the Federal Constitutional Court. She is in a civil union.

In a unanimous 2014 decision by the eight-judge First Senate on abolishing a law allowing companies to be passed from generation to generation tax free, Baer – alongside fellow members Reinhard Gaier and Johannes Masing – issued a supplementary decision saying the judgment should have included wording to ensure that revised tax rules did not undercut the basic purpose of inheritance law, which was to hinder excessive concentration of wealth among a privileged few: "The inheritance tax serves not only to generate tax revenue. Rather it is also an instrument of the state to hinder disproportionate accumulation of wealth from generation to generation solely as a result of origin or personal connection."

In 2015, Baer was one of the judges who overturned the ban on the wearing of hijabs in German classrooms, arguing that a general prohibition, incumbent on teachers in state schools, of expressing religious beliefs by outer appearance, is not compatible with their freedom of faith and their freedom to profess a belief.

On the initiative of president Andreas Voßkuhle, Baer was among four justices who were mandated in 2016 to draft a revised code of conduct, which set out rules for the justices' public appearances, gifts, secondary income and other aspects.

== Works ==
- Comparative Constitutionalism: Cases and Materials (together with Norman Dorsen, Michel Rosenfeld, András Sajó), St. Paul 2010

== Other activities ==
- Stiftung Forum Recht, member of the board of trustees
- Hirschfeld Eddy Foundation, member of the scientific advisory board
- Human Rights Centre of the University of Potsdam, member of the scientific advisory board
- Institute for Human Sciences (IWM), member of the board of trustees
- Max Planck Institute for Research on Collective Goods, member of the academic advisory board
- Total E-Quality initiative, member of the board of trustees
- GENDER. Journal for Gender, Culture and Society, member of the advisory board
- STREIT – Feministische Rechtszeitschrift, member of the Editorial Team
- Wittenberg Institute for Research on Higher Education (HoF) at the Martin Luther University of Halle-Wittenberg, member of the scientific advisory board (2007–2011)

== Recognition ==
- 1993: Scholarly Writing Award, University of Michigan Law School, US
- 1995: Walter Kolb Memorial Award of the City of Frankfurt
- 2002: Award for Good Teaching, Philosophische Fakultät III, Humboldt University of Berlin, Germany
- 2013: Augspurg-Heymann Award ("Augspurg-Heymann-Preis für couragierte Lesben"") Augspurg-Heymann-Preis
- 2014: Honorary Doctorate of the University of Michigan, US
- 2014: Honorary Professor Taipei National University, Taiwan
- 2018: Honorary Doctorate of the University of Lucerne, Switzerland
- 2018: Honorary Doctorate of Hasselt University, Belgium

In July 2017, Baer was elected a Corresponding Fellow of the British Academy (FBA), the United Kingdom's national academy for the humanities and social sciences.
