= Tia DeNora =

British music sociologist

Tia DeNora FBA (born 1958) is Professor of Sociology of Music and Director of Research, in the Department of Sociology/Philosophy at the University of Exeter.

== Biography ==
DeNora's undergraduate studies were in musicology and sociology. She completed her PhD in Sociology in 1989 at the University of California, San Diego. From then until 1992, she worked at University of Wales, Cardiff, where DeNora was a University of Wales Fellow from 1989 to 1991. DeNora moved to Exeter in 1992. DeNora was Chair of the European Sociological Association Network on Sociology of the Arts from 1999 to 2001 and is a Vice President of the International Sociological Association Research Committee on Sociology of the Arts. She was an elected member of the Council of the American Sociological Association Section on Science, Knowledge and Technology from 1994 to 1997 and is currently on the Council of the American Sociological Association Culture Section (until 2008). With Pete Martin, she has co-edited the Manchester University Press series, Music and Society.

Since 2010, DeNora has been collaborating with music therapists Gary Ansdell and Sarah Wilson from the charity Nordoff robbins on a longitudinal study of music and mental health, which is intended to result in a self-described "triptych" of scholarly publications, of which the first two have been issued as of 2015: Music Asylums: Wellbeing Through Music in Everyday Life (2013), authored by DeNora, and Making Sense of Reality: Culture and Perception in Everyday Life (2014), authored by Ansdell.

In July 2018 DeNora was elected Fellow of the British Academy (FBA).

== Publications ==
- Beethoven and the Construction of Genius: Musical Politics in Vienna 1792-1803, Berkeley, Los Angeles and London: University of California Press, 1995.
- Music in Everyday Life, Cambridge: Cambridge University Press, 2000.
- After Adorno: Rethinking Music Sociology, Cambridge: Cambridge University Press, 2003.
- Musical Consciousness, Poetics: Journal of Empirical Research on Literature, the Media and the Arts, 2001 (July), with W.R. Witkin, editor.
  - (Honorable Mention, American Sociological Association Culture Section Book Prize, 2005)
- Music Asylums: Wellbeing through Music in Everyday Life, Farnham, Surrey and Burlington, VT: Ashgate, 2013. ISBN 978-1-4094-3759-8
