= Thomas A. Regelski =

American music educator (1941–2024)

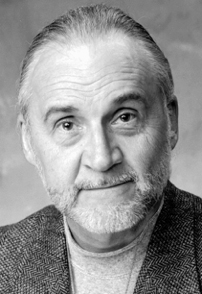
- Born: Thomas Adam Regelski; 4 May 1941; Florida, NY, United States
- Died: 12 October 2024 (aged 83); Helsinki, Finland
- Children: None

Academic background
- Education: SUNY Fredonia (B.M.) Columbia University, Teachers College, New York City (M.M.) Ohio University (Ph.D.)
- Thesis: Music and Painting in the Paragon of Eugène Délacroix (1970)

Academic work
- Discipline: Comparative Arts/Aesthetics
- Institutions: SUNY Fredonia (1976–1978, 1980–2001) Helsinki University (2005–2018)
- Main interests: Music Education

Thomas Adam Regelski (4 May 1941 – 12 October 2024) was an American music educator who was Distinguished Teaching Professor of Music at the State University of New York at Fredonia N.Y. He was born in Florida, NY and spent the majority of his professional career in Fredonia, NY.

He published over 135 peer-reviewed articles (see Google Scholar) on teaching ethics, philosophy, aesthetics, musicology, curriculum, psychology and sociology of music and music education. He was a leading scholar of a philosophy of praxis, a social and ethical philosophy that seeks to supersede aesthetics as the foundation of music, music appreciation, and music education.

== Professional and academic career ==
=== Education ===
Regelski studied piano in his youth. In 1958, he was accepted at SUNY Fredonia where he earned a B.M.. In his Junior year at SUNY Fredonia, he was able to study abroad at Antwerp Conservatory (Belgium) focusing on conducting, composition, and piano. After graduation from SUNY Fredonia in 1962, Regelski went on to earn his M.M. from Columbia University, Teachers College. He conducted Mozart's Requiem (Choruses) in June 1963 for his Master's graduation project. After teaching in public schools for several years, he completed doctoral studies in the philosophy and aesthetics of art and music at Ohio University from 1978 to 1980.

=== Career ===
Regelski began his career in public schools teaching music (rural-Bemus Point N.Y.; urban-Middletown N.Y.). After earning his doctorate, he returned to his alma mater (SUNY Fredonia, School of Music) where he taught secondary school teaching methods, choral conducting and methods, and foundation of education studies in philosophy, psychology, and sociology (1980–2001).

He also taught at Aichi University in Nagoya, Japan (1985), Sibelius Academy in Helsinki, Finland (as a Fulbright Scholar in 2000), and was a research fellow at the Philosophy of Education Research Center at Harvard University (1991).

A later position was as Docent at University of Helsinki, Faculty of Behavioral Science (including education) where he taught "Writing of Scholarly English," (2005–2018) for students and faculty wishing to publish in English.

=== Achievements ===
- Awarded the Distinguished Professor Rank for Teaching from SUNY Fredonia (1977) (at the time, a SUNY-wide award).
- Awarded the Dean of Fine Art's Award for Best Thesis (Music and Painting in the Paragon of Eugène Délacroix) from Ohio University (1980).
- Chair of the SUNY Fredonia Music Education Department (1982–2000).
- Won the Kasling Award for "Outstanding Research by Senior Faculty Member, culminating in the Kasling Lecture" (1999).
- Awarded the Alumni Outstanding Achievement Award from SUNY Fredonia (2022).

== Mayday Group and publications ==
Regelski was the co-founder (with J.T. Gates) of the MayDay Group. From its inception until 2007, he was the founding editor of its e-journal Action, Criticism, and Theory for Music Education. Later, he was also the founding editor of TOPICS for Music Education Praxis, with a focus on translating theory into praxis, and praxis into theory.

He was the author of Principles and Problems of Music Education (Prentice-Hall, 1975); Arts Education and Brain Research (Alliance for Arts Education/MENC, 1978); Teaching General Music: Action Learning for Middle and Secondary Schools (Schirmer Books, 1981); Teaching General Music in Grades 4-8: A Musicianship Approach (Oxford University Press, 2014); co-editor (with J.T. Gates) of Music Education for Changing Times (Springer, 2009); A Brief Introduction to Music and Music Education as Social Praxis (Routledge 2016); and Curriculum Philosophy and Theory for Music Education Praxis, Oxford University Press, (2021).

His choral compositions and arrangements have received positive acclaim.

== Journal publications and influence ==
Regelski published over 135 peer-reviewed articles on teaching ethics, philosophy, aesthetics, musicology, curriculum, psychology and sociology of music and music education. From 1995, he was a leading scholar of a philosophy of praxis, a social and ethical philosophy (stemming from Aristotle's Nicomachean Ethics) that seeks to supplant aesthetics as the foundation of music appreciation and music education. Along with David Elliott, he was a leader in making praxical (also known as praxial or praxis) theory a topic of growing influence in music and music education scholarship. A praxical philosophy denies the claims of traditional aesthetics about the supposedly "good-for-its-owns sake” benefit of aesthetic experience. Instead, it emphasizes both praxis philosophy (e.g., Aristotle) and phenomenological sociology (e.g., Alfred Schütz) in support of the benefits of music as a social praxis and of the importance of school music teaching as a professional praxis for promoting musical praxis of one or another kind throughout life.

== Personal life and death ==
Regelski began piano lessons at age five with his 1st Grade school teacher and then with a traveling piano teacher who came to Regelski's home for private lessons. He later studied with a ‘real’ professional piano teacher for five or six years—despite being always involved in school sports. He was always recognized locally as “musical,” and it seemed that he never seriously considered any other career than music after graduation from high school.

During his first two years working at SUNY Fredonia, he married an artist and began to cultivate a serious interest in art. So much so that he enrolled in Comparative Arts/Aesthetics Doctoral Program at Ohio University with the intent of changing his career to Art History. There were few jobs available in that field at the time. Regelski was able to rejoin the faculty at SUNY Fredonia in the Music Education Department. His love for art continued with a focus on Japanese art and antiques after traveling and living in Japan in the 1980s. He hosted two Japanese children (1983–85) who attended school in Westfield, NY. One is now a linguistics professor specializing in English, the other an art professor specializing in sculpture. He began collecting Japanese art pieces after his time in Japan and later had a sizable collection reaching 3500 high quality pieces, starting from pre-history to a few contemporary, mostly Edo and Meiji, and specializing in maki-e lacquer. He and his wife created a website and web shop (Miyabi Antiques) where many of these pieces can be viewed.

After spending a year at the Sibelius Academy in Helsinki, Finland, Regelski returned to SUNY Fredonia, from which he retired in 2001. He returned to Finland (attracted by cross-country skiing), where he met and married a Finnish marine biologist. They resided in a Helsinki suburb.

Regelski died at his home in Helsinki on 12 October 2024.

== Musical compositions ==
- Look to this Day. SATB (1970)
- This is the Day. SATB (1970)
- The Fallen Warrior. SATB (1972)
- Between Before We Are and What We Were. SATB (1983)

== Choral arrangements ==
- The Lass from the Low Country. SATB (1970)
- For All We Know. SATB (1970)
- Sinnerman. SATB (1970)
- Old Coat. SATB (1971)
- What Have They Done to the Rain? SA(T)B (1971)
- Corner of the Sky. SATB (1976)
- Whose Garden Was This? SA(T)B (1976)
- One Tin Soldier. SATB (1980)
- The Grave. SATB (1982)
- Wayfarin’ Stranger. SATB/solo voice (1982)
- Feelin’ Good. SATB (1985)
- Laura. SATB (1985)
- Love the World Away. SATB (1986)
- Sweet Beginning. SATB (1986)
- The Joker. SATB (1986)
- The Water is Wide. SATB (1986)
- Be Kind to Your Parents. SA(T)B (1986)
- Pretty Women. SSAATTBB (1987)
- More Than You Know. SSAATTBB (1988)
- Hush-a-bye. SSAATTBB (1988)
- Motherless Child. SSAATTBB solo (1989)
- Just in Time. SATB (1990)
- Silent Night. SATB (1993)
