= Bella Gaia =

Bella Gaia is a live music art and show produced by Kenji Williams and other New York artists.

== Concept ==
The show layers full-dome projections of hyperspectral supercomputer-enhanced NASA satellite imagery and views of the Earth from space. These elements are fused together with time lapse nature photography, cultural heritage footage, dance and world music. The intent is to convey the fragility of the human environment through the overview effect.

== Awards ==
Bella Gaia has won Science Media Awards, the Fiske Fulldome Film Festival, the My Hero Award, the Macau International Fulldome festival and the Transformational Film Festival.

== See also ==
- Gaia hypothesis
- Noosphere
