= Popular music pedagogy =

Systematic teaching and learning of popular music

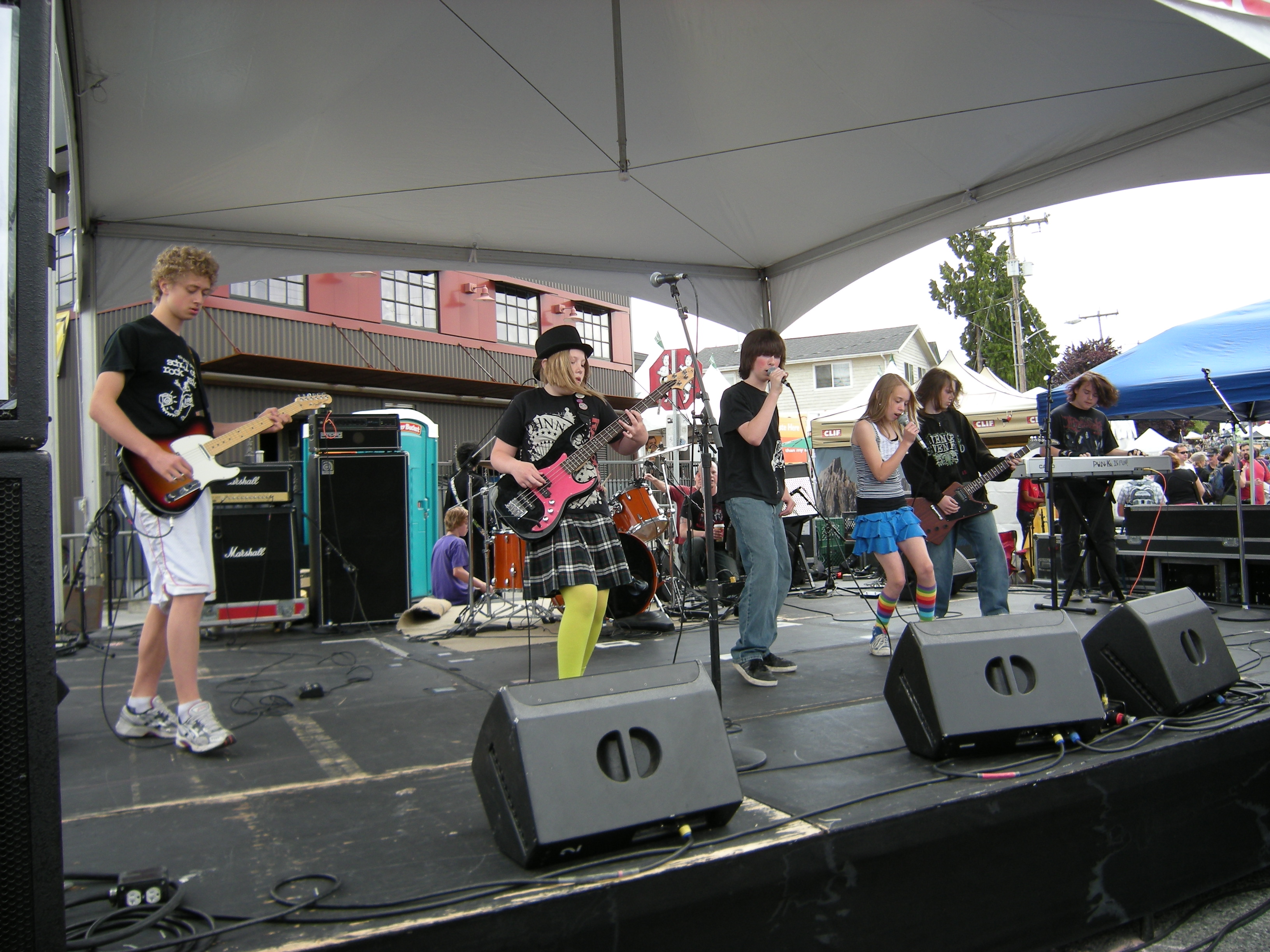
Students from the Paul Green School of Rock Music performing at the 2009 Fremont Fair, Seattle, Washington

Popular music pedagogy — alternatively called popular music education, rock music pedagogy, or rock music education — is a development in music education consisting of the systematic teaching and learning of popular music both inside and outside formal classroom settings. Popular music pedagogy tends to emphasize group improvisation and is more often associated with community music activities than fully institutionalized school music ensembles.

The origins of popular music pedagogy may be traced to the gradual infusion of rock music into formal schooling since the 1960s (in the UK, the USA, and elsewhere), however it has expanded as a specialization to include the offering of degree programs — including graduate degrees — in institutions of higher education. Some notable community institutions, such as Cleveland's Rock and Roll Hall of Fame and Museum and Seattle's Experience Music Project have also contributed to the development of popular music pedagogy through symposia and educational outreach programs.

The UK has pioneered the teaching of popular music, the first degree programme beginning as early as 1994 at Salford University. Postgraduate programmes were later introduced, for example at the Institute of Popular Music at the University of Liverpool. There are now more than 76 popular music studies degree programmes in the UK. These programs expanded when the UK government made popular music a core part of schools' music provision through the Curriculum 2000 developments. The effect rippled into other countries as well. Popular music is commonly taught in German speaking countries and in Ghana, for example. It is also increasingly common in Australia. However, popular music courses tend to be based in newer institutions, rather than older more traditional ones, which often still focus principally on classical music.

== Degree programs ==
Numerous institutions worldwide now offer popular music pedagogy as a component of their degree programs. The following is a partial list of institutions that offer advanced degree programs in popular music pedagogy and related fields:

=== Australia ===
- Griffith University (B. Popular Music)

=== Denmark ===
- Rhythmic Music Conservatory

=== Finland ===
- Sibelius Academy
- Metropolia University of Applied Sciences, Music Degree

=== Ireland ===
- Cork School Of Music

=== The Netherlands ===
- Fontys Rockacademie, Tilburg
- Academie voor Popcultuur (Academy for Pop Culture), Leeuwarden

=== Norway ===
- University of Agder. Department of Popular Music.

=== United Kingdom ===
- Liverpool Institute for Performing Arts
- University of Huddersfield
- University of the West of Scotland
- Goldsmiths, University of London

=== United States ===
- Berklee College of Music
- University of Southern California
- Shenandoah University
- Westminster Choir College
- University of Miami
- New York University
- Belmont University
- Middle Tennessee State University
- Catawba College

== Popular music festivals in the United States of America ==
- Austin City Limits Music Festival - Austin, TX
- Beale Street Music Festival - Memphis, TN
- Bonnaroo Music Festival - Manchester, TN
- CMJ Music Marathon - New York, NY
- Coachella Valley Music and Arts Festival - Indio, CA
- Counterpoint - Kingston Downs, GA
- Electric Daisy Carnival - New York, NY
- The Fest - Gainesville, FL
- Firefly Music Festival - Dover, DE
- Fun Fun Fun Fest - Austin, TX
- Governors Ball Music Festival - New York, NY and Las Vegas, NV
- Lollapalooza - Chicago, IL
- Riot Fest - Chicago, IL
- Rock the Bells - TBA
- Sasquatch! Music Festival - Gorge, WA
- South by Southwest - Austin, TX
- TomorrowWorld - Chattahoochee Hills, GA
- Ultra Music Festival - Miami, FL
- Voodoo Experience - New Orleans, LA
- Warped Tour - Various locations

== See also ==
- Music education
- Musicology
- Ethnomusicology
- Popular music
- Cultural studies

== Bibliography ==
- Around the Sound: Popular Music in Performance, Education, and Scholarship - symposium proceedings (2001, Seattle: University of Washington Publications, for the Experience Music Project), *Around the Sound: Popular Music in Performance, Education, and Scholarship - symposium proceedings (2001, Seattle: University of Washington Publications, for the Experience Music Project),
- Cooper, B. Lee & Condon, Rebecca A. The Popular Music Teaching Handbook: An Educator’s Guide to Music-Related Print Resources (Libraries Unlimited, 2004).
- Davis, Sharon G. "That Thing you Do!: Compositional Processes of a Rock Band". International Journal of Education and the Arts 6 no. 16 (2005).
- Green, Lucy. (2002). How Popular Musicians Learn: A Way Ahead for Music Education. Aldershot: Ashgate (2002).
- Hebert, David G. "Originality and Institutionalization: Factors Engendering Resistance to Popular Music Pedagogy in the U.S.A.." Music Education Research International 5, pp. 12–21 (2011).
- Hebert, D. G. Jazz and Rock Music. In W. M. Anderson & P. S. Campbell (Eds.), Multicultural Perspectives in Music Education, Vol.1 (third edition) (pp. 112–127). Lanham, MD: Rowman-Littlefield Publishers (2011).
- Hebert, David G. & Campbell, Patricia Shehan "Rock Music in American Schools: Positions and Practices Since the 1960s." International Journal of Music Education 36 no. 1, pp. 14–22 (2000).
- Lebler, Don "Popular Music Pedagogy: Peer Learning in Practice." Music Education Research 10 no. 2, pp. 93–213 (2008).
- Oehler, Susan & Hanley, Jason "Perspectives of Popular Music Pedagogy in Practice: An Introduction." Journal of Popular Music Studies 21 no. 1, pp.2-19 (2009).
- Powell, B; Krikun, A; & Pignato, J. M. “Something’s happening here!”: Popular music education in the United States. IASPM Journal, 5(1), 4-22 (2015).
- Rodriguez, Carlos Xavier (Ed.). Bridging the Gap: Popular Music and Music Education (2003, MENC).
- Smith, G.D. (2014). Popular music in higher education. In G. Welch & I. Papageorgi (Eds.), Advanced Musical Performance: Investigations in Higher Education Learning, (pp. 33–48). Farnham: Ashgate.
- Stimeling, T. & Katz, M. "Songwriting as Musicological Inquiry: Examples from the Popular Music Classroom." Journal of Music History Pedagogy 2 (2011).
- Tønsberg, Knut. Value changes in Norwegian music education. From increased acceptance of rock to a reduced status for classical music? Nordic research in music education. Yearbook Vol, 14. 145-166. (2013).
