= Popular music =

Music considered to have widespread appeal

Popular music is music with wide appeal that is typically distributed to large audiences through the music industry. These forms and styles can be enjoyed and performed by people with little or no musical training. As a kind of popular art, it stands in contrast to art music. Art music was historically disseminated through the performances of written music, although since the beginning of the recording industry, it is also disseminated through recordings. Traditional music forms such as early blues songs or hymns were passed along orally, or to smaller, local audiences.

The original application of the term is to music of the 1880s Tin Pan Alley period in the United States. Although popular music sometimes is known as "pop music", the two terms are not interchangeable. In broader senses, pop music can indeed refer to all forms of popular music, but in other situations it can refer to a more specific genre within popular music. Popular music songs and pieces typically have easily singable melodies. The song structure of popular music commonly involves repetition of sections, with the verse and chorus or refrain repeating throughout the song and the bridge providing a contrasting and transitional section within a piece. From the 1960s through the mid-2000s, albums collecting songs were the dominant form for recording and consuming English-language popular music, in a period known as the album era.

In the 2000s, with songs and pieces available as digital sound files, it has become easier for music to spread from one country or region to another. Some popular music forms have become global, while others have a wide appeal within the culture of their origin. Through the mixture of musical genres, new popular music forms are created to reflect the ideals of a global culture.

== Definition ==
Some sort of popular music has existed for as long as there has been an urban middle class to consume it. What distinguishes it above all is the aesthetic level it is aimed at. The cultural elite has always endowed music with an exalted if not self-important religious or aesthetic status, while for the rural folk, it has been practical and unselfconscious, an accompaniment to fieldwork or to the festivals that provide periodic escape from toil. "

— Robert Christgau, in Collier's Encyclopedia (1984)

Scholars have classified music as "popular" based on various factors, including whether a song or piece becomes known to listeners mainly from hearing the music (in contrast with classical music, in which many musicians learn pieces from sheet music). This includes its appeal to diverse listeners, its treatment as a marketplace commodity in a capitalist context, and other factors. Sales of 'recordings' or sheet music are one measure. Middleton and Manuel note that this definition has problems because multiple listens or plays of the same song or piece are not counted. Evaluating appeal based on size of audience (mass appeal) or whether the audience is of a certain social class is another way to define popular music, but this, too, has problems in that social categories of people cannot be applied accurately to musical styles. Manuel states that one criticism of popular music is that it is produced by large media conglomerates and passively consumed by the public, who merely buy or reject what music is being produced. He claims that the listeners in the scenario would not have been able to make the choice of their favorite music, which negates the previous conception of popular music. Moreover, "understandings of popular music have changed with time". Middleton argues that if research were to be done on the field of popular music, there would be a level of stability within societies to characterize historical periods, distribution of music, and the patterns of influence and continuity within the popular styles of music.

Anahid Kassabian separated popular music into four categories:

- "popular as populist", or having overtones of liberation and expression; see jazz, Latin music, and rhythm and blues.
- "popular as folk", or stating that the music is written by the people, for the people; see country music, reggae, and gospel music.
- "popular as counterculture", or empowering citizens to act against the oppression they face; see punk rock, heavy metal music, and hip-hop.
- "popular as mass", or the music becomes the tool for oppression.

A society's popular music reflects the ideals that are prevalent at the time it is performed or published. David Riesman states that the youth audiences of popular music fit into either a majority group or a subculture. The majority group listens to the commercially produced styles while the subcultures find a minority style to transmit their own values. This allows youth to choose what music they identify with, which gives them power as consumers to control the market of popular music.

Music critic Robert Christgau coined the term "semipopular music" in 1970 to describe records that seemed accessible for popular consumption but proved unsuccessful commercially. "I recognized that something else was going on—the distribution system appeared to be faltering, FM and all", he later wrote in Christgau's Record Guide: Rock Albums of the Seventies (1981), citing that records like The Velvet Underground and The Gilded Palace of Sin (by Flying Burrito Brothers) possessed populist qualities yet failed to impact the record charts. "Just as semiclassical music is a systematic dilution of highbrow preferences, semipopular music is a cross-bred concentration of fashionable modes." In his mind, a liking "for the nasty, brutish, and short intensifies a common semipopular tendency in which lyrical and conceptual sophistication are applauded while musical sophistication—jazz chops or classical design or avant-garde innovation—is left to the specialists."

American folk singer Pete Seeger defined pop music as "professional music which draws upon both folk music and fine arts music".

== Form of Western popular music ==
Form in popular music is most often sectional, the most common sections being verse, chorus or refrain, and bridge. Other common forms include thirty-two-bar form, chorus form, and twelve-bar blues. Popular music songs are rarely composed using different music for each stanza of the lyrics (songs composed in this fashion are said to be "through-composed").

The verse and chorus are considered the primary elements. Each verse usually has the same melody (possibly with some slight modifications), but the lyrics change for most verses. The chorus (or "refrain") usually has a melodic phrase and a key lyrical line which is repeated. Pop songs may have an introduction and coda ("tag"), but these elements are not essential to the identity of most songs. Pop songs that use verses and choruses often have a bridge, a section which connects the verse and chorus at one or more points in the song.

The verse and chorus are usually repeated throughout a song, while the bridge, intro, and coda (also called an "outro") tend to be used only once. Some pop songs may have a solo section, particularly in rock or blues-influenced pop. During the solo section, one or more instruments play a melodic line which may be the melody used by the singer, or, in blues- or jazz-influenced pop, the solo may be improvised based on the chord progression. A solo usually features a single instrumental performer (e.g., a guitarist or a harmonica player) or less commonly, more than one instrumentalist (e.g., a trumpeter and a sax player).

Thirty-two-bar form uses four sections, most often eight measures long each (4×8=32), two verses or A sections, a contrasting B section (the bridge or "middle-eight") and a return of the verse in one last A section (AABA). Verse-chorus form or ABA form may be combined with AABA form, in compound AABA forms. Variations such as a1 and a2 can also be used. The repetition of one chord progression may mark off the only section in a simple verse form such as the twelve bar blues.

== History ==
=== Development in North America and Europe ===
==== Industry ====
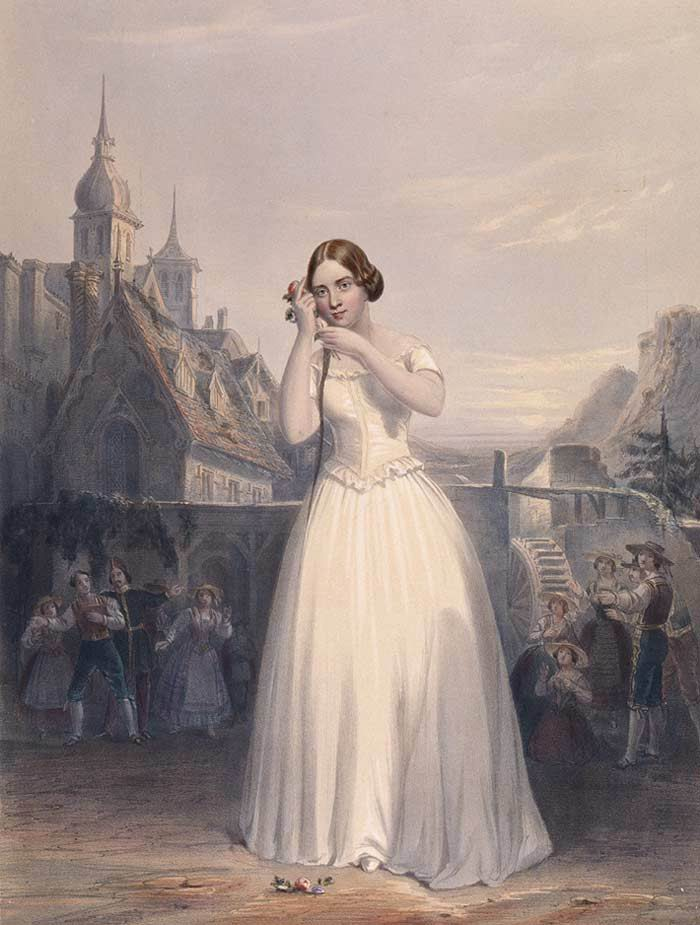
The 19th century singer Jenny Lind depicted performing La sonnambula

"The most significant feature of the emergent popular music industry of the late 18th and early 19th centuries was the extent of its focus on the commodity form of sheet music". The availability of inexpensive, widely available sheet music versions of popular songs and instrumental music pieces made it possible for music to be disseminated to a wide audience of amateur, middle-class music-makers, who could play and sing popular music at home. Amateur music-making in the 19th century often centred around the piano, as this instrument could play melodies, chords and basslines, thus enabling a pianist to reproduce popular songs and pieces. In addition to the influence of sheet music, another factor was the increasing availability during the late 18th and early 19th century of public popular music performances in "pleasure gardens and dance halls, popular theatres and concert rooms".

The early popular music performers worked hand-in-hand with the sheet music industry to promote popular sheet music. One of the early popular music performers to attain widespread popularity was a Swedish opera singer Jenny Lind, who toured the US in the mid-19th century. In addition to living room amateur music-making during the 19th century, more people began getting involved in music during this era by participating in amateur choirs, joining brass bands or playing in amateur orchestras.

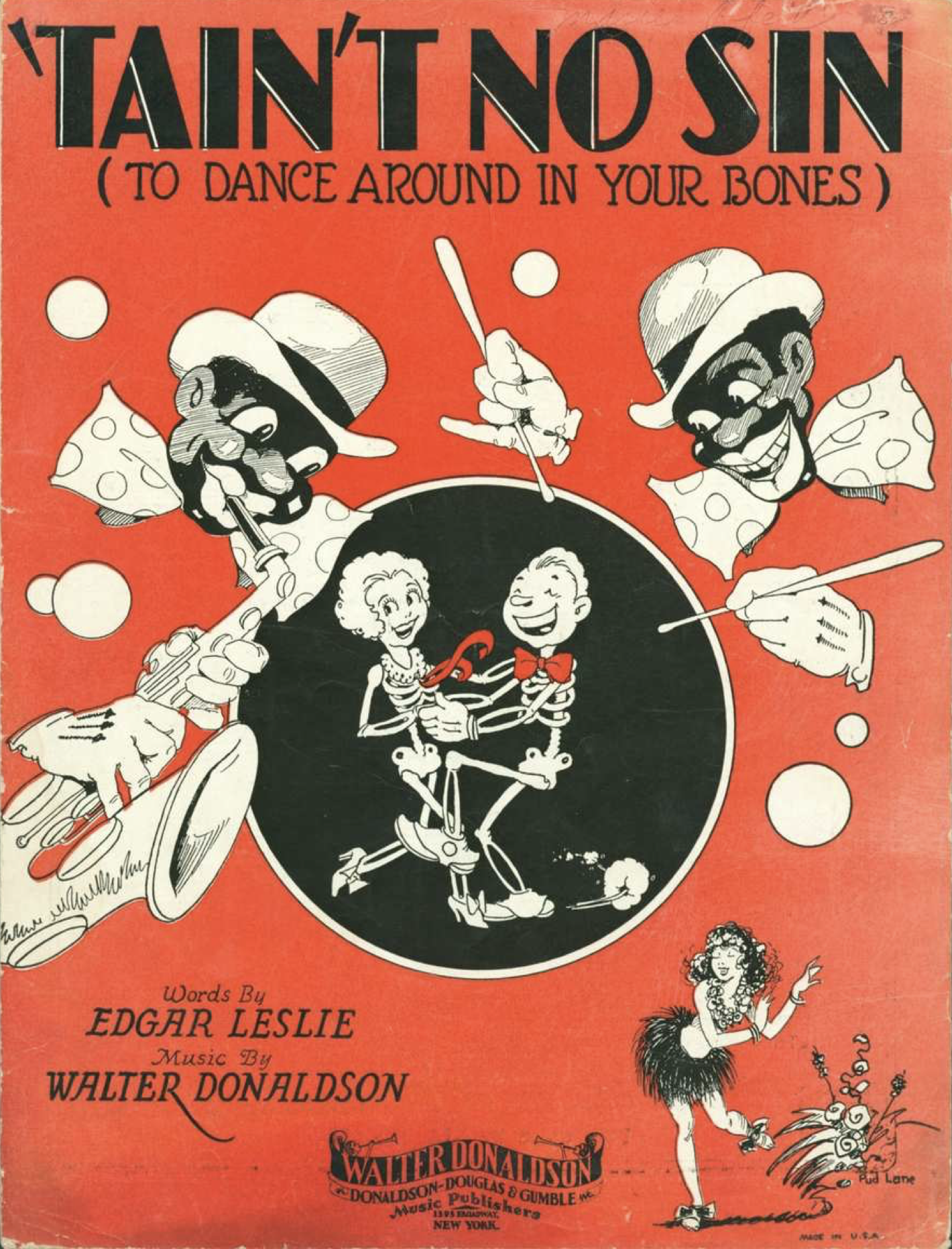
1929 record with a song by Walter Donaldson and Edgar Leslie, cover

The center of the music publishing industry in the US during the late 19th century was in New York's 'Tin Pan Alley' district. The Tin Pan Alley music publishers developed a new method for promoting sheet music: incessant promotion of new songs. One of the technological innovations that helped to spread popular music around the turn of the century was player pianos. A player piano could be used to record a skilled pianist's rendition of a piano piece. This recorded performance could be "played back" on another player piano. This allowed a larger number of music lovers to hear the new popular piano tunes. By the early 1900s, the big trends in popular music were the increasing popularity of vaudeville theaters and dance halls and a new invention—the gramophone player. The record industry grew very rapidly; "By 1920 there were almost 80 record companies in Britain, and almost 200 in the USA". The availability of records enabled a larger percentage of the population to hear the top singers and bands.

Radio broadcasting of music, which began in the early 1920s, helped to spread popular songs to a huge audience, enabling a much larger proportion of the population to hear songs performed by professional singers and music ensembles, including individuals from lower income groups who previously would not have been able to afford concert tickets. Radio broadcasting increased the ability of songwriters, singers and bandleaders to become nationally known. Another factor which helped to disseminate popular music was the introduction of "talking pictures"—sound films—in the late 1920s, which also included music and songs. In the late 1920s and throughout the 1930s, there was a move towards consolidation in the recording industry, which led several major companies to dominate the record industry.

In the 1950s and 1960s, the new invention of television began to play an increasingly important role in disseminating new popular music. Variety shows regularly showcased popular singers and bands. In the 1960s, the development of new technologies in recording, such as multitrack recorders gave sound engineers and record producers an increasingly important role in popular music. By using multitrack recording techniques, sound engineers could create new sounds and sound effects that were not possible using traditional "live" recording techniques, such as singers performing their own backup vocals or having lead guitarists play rhythm guitars behind their guitar solo. The next decade saw moves away from these sensibilities, as Robert Christgau noted in Christgau's Record Guide: Rock Albums of the Seventies (1981):

"In popular music, embracing the '70s meant both an elitist withdrawal from the messy concert and counterculture scene and a profiteering pursuit of the lowest common denominator in FM radio and album rock ... In the '70s the powerful took over, as rock industrialists capitalized on the national mood to reduce potent music to an often reactionary species of entertainment—and to transmute rock's popular base from audience to market."

In the 1970s, the trend towards consolidation in the recording industry continued to the point that the "... dominance was in the hands of five huge transnational organizations, three American-owned (WEA, RCA, CBS) and two European-owned companies (EMI, Polygram)". In the 1990s, the consolidation trend took a new turn: inter-media consolidation. This trend saw music recording companies being consolidated with film, television, magazines, and other media companies, an approach which facilitated cross-marketing promotion between subsidiaries. For example, a record company's singing star could be cross-promoted by the conglomerate's television talk shows and magazine arms.

The "introduction of digital equipment (mixing desks, synthesizers, samplers, sequencers)" in the 1980s resulted in what Grove Dictionary of Music dubbed the creation of "new sound worlds", as well as facilitating DIY music production by amateur musicians and "tiny independent record labels". In the 1990s, the availability of sound recording software and effects units software meant that an amateur indie band could record an album—which required a fully equipped recording studio in previous decades—using little more than a laptop and a good quality microphone. That said, the audio quality of modern recording studios still outstrips what an amateur can produce.

== Changes ==
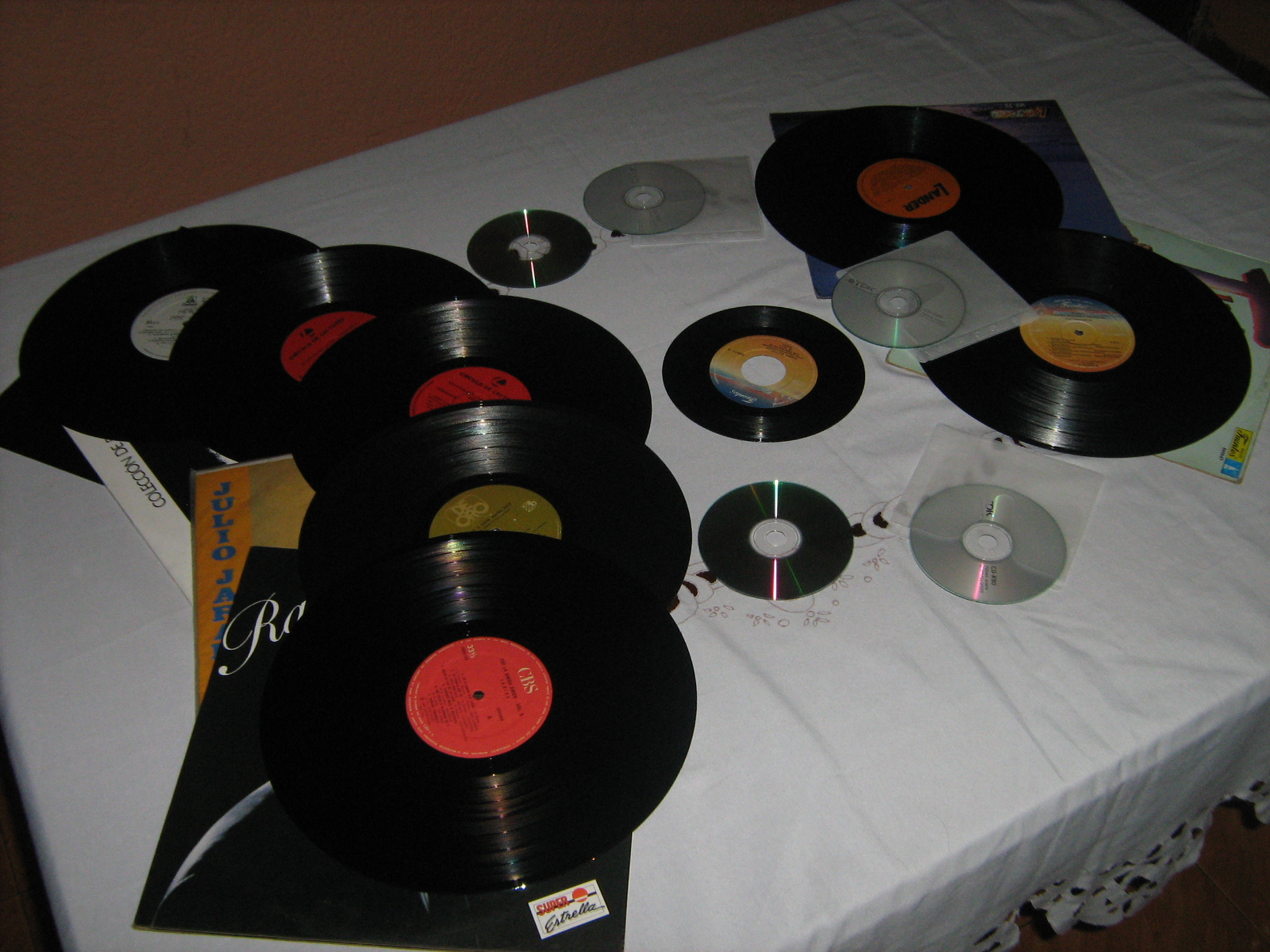
Since the 20th century, several music formats received dominance, from 7-inch vinyl, to 12-inch vinyl, to CDs.

In addition to many changes in specific sounds and technologies used, there has been a shift in the content and key elements of popular music since the 1960s. One major change is that popular music has gotten slower; the average BPM of popular songs from the 1960s was 116, while the average of the 2000s was 100BPM. Additionally, songs getting radio play in the 1960s were, on average, only about three minutes long. In contrast, most of the songs in the Billboard Top 5 in 2018 were between 3:21 and 3:40 minutes long. There has also been a drop in the use of major keys and a rise in the use of minor keys since the 1960s; 85% of songs were in a major key in that decade, while only around 40% of songs are in a major key now. The subject matter and lyrics of popular music have also undergone major change, becoming sadder as well as more antisocial and self-centered since the 1960s. There has also been an increasing trend of songs' emotional content, key, and tempo not following common associations; for example, fast songs with sad subject matters or in a minor key, or slow songs with happier content or in a major key.

There are multiple possible explanations for many of these changes. One reason for the brevity of songs in the past was the physical capability of records. Vinyl record singles, which were heavily favored for radio play, only had room for about three minutes of music, physically limiting the possible length of popular songs. With the invention of CDs in 1982, and more recently with streaming, music can be as long or short as both writers and listeners wish. However, songs have shortened again, partially due to the ubiquity of streaming. The average song length in 2018 was 3 minutes and 30 seconds, 20 seconds shorter than the average in 2014. The most probable cause of this is that artists are now paid per individual stream, and longer songs could mean fewer streams. As for the difference in songs' subject matter and emotional content, popular music since the late 1960s has increasingly been used to promote social change and political agendas. Artists since that time have often focused their music on current events and subjects relevant to the current generations. Another theory is that globalization makes audiences' tastes more diverse, so different ideas in music have a chance to gain popularity.

== Global perspective ==
In contrast to Western popular music, genres of music that originated outside of the West are often categorized as world music. This label turns otherwise popular styles of music into an exotic and unknown category. The Western concept of 'World Music' homogenizes many different genres of popular music under one accessible term for Western audiences. New media technology has led urban music styles to filter into distant rural areas across the globe. The rural areas, in turn, are able to give feedback to the urban centers about the new styles of music. Urbanization, modernization, exposure to foreign music and mass media have contributed to hybrid urban pop styles. The hybrid styles have also found a space within Western popular music through the expressions of their national culture. Recipient cultures borrow elements from host cultures and alter the meaning and context found in the host culture. Many Western styles, in turn, have become international styles through multinational recording studios.

=== Africa ===
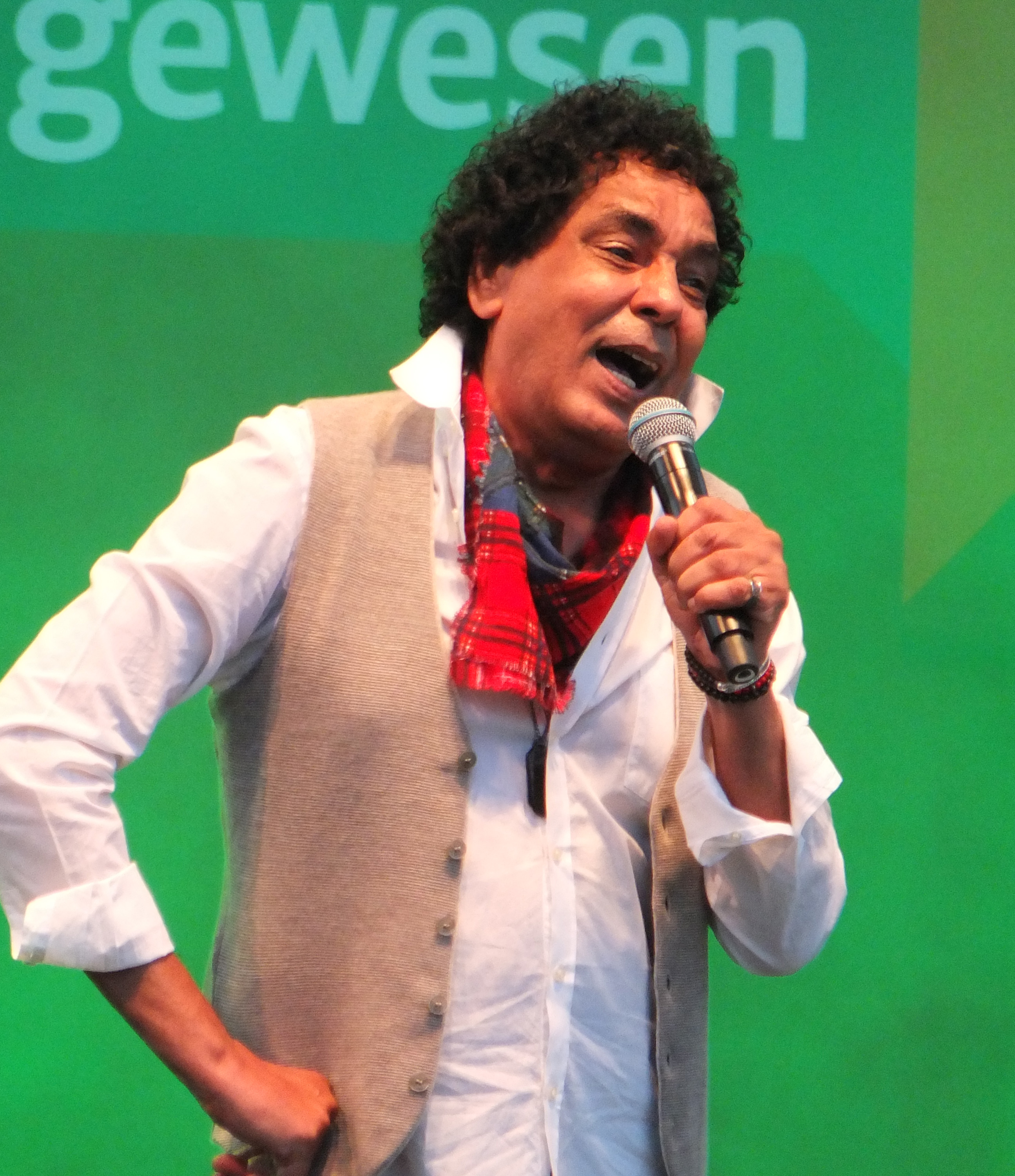
Egyptian pop star Mohamed Mounir

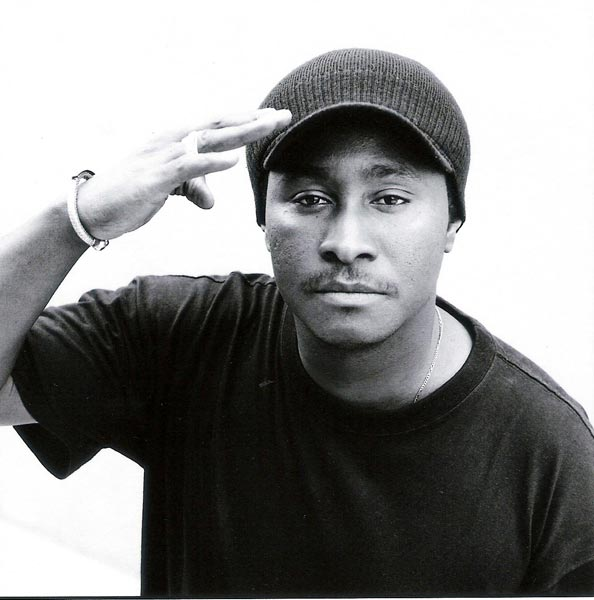
Senegalese rapper Didier Awadi

Popular African music styles have stemmed from traditional entertainment genres, rather than evolving from music used with certain traditional ceremonies like weddings, births, or funerals. African popular music as a whole has been influenced by European countries, African-American and Afro-Latin music, and region-specific styles that became popular across a wider range of people. Although due to the significance and strong position of culture in traditional African music, African popular music tends to stay within the roots of traditional African Popular Music.

The genre of music, Maskanda, is popular in its culture of origin, South Africa. Although maskanda is a traditional music genre by definition, the people who listen to it influence the ideals that are brought forth in the music. A popular maskandi artist, Phuzekhemisi, had to lessen the political influence within his music to be ready for the public sphere. His music producer, West Nkosi, was looking for the commercial success in Phuzekhemisi's music rather than starting a political controversy.

Political songs have been an important category of African popular music in many societies. During the continent's struggle against colonial rule, nationalistic songs boosted citizens' morale. These songs were based on Western marches and hymns reflecting the European education system that the early nationalistic leaders grew up in. Not all African political songs were based on Western styles. For example, in South Africa, the political songs during the Anti-Apartheid Movement were based on traditional tribal styles along with hybrid forms of imported genres. Activists used protest and freedom songs to persuade individuals to take action, become educated with the struggle, and empower others to be politically conscious. These songs reflected the nuances between the different classes involved in the liberation struggle.

One of the genres people of Africa use for political expression is hip-hop. Although hip-hop in Africa is based on the North American template, it has been remade to produce new meanings for African young people. This allows the genre to be both locally and globally influential. African youth are shaped by the fast-growing genre's ability to communicate, educate, empower, and entertain. Artists who would have started in traditional music genres, like maskanda, became hip-hop artists to provide a stronger career path for themselves. These rappers compare themselves to the traditional artists like the griot and oral storyteller, who both had a role in reflecting on the internal dynamics of the larger society.

=== America ===
In the contemporary United States, one of the most popular forms of music is rap. DJ Kool Herc, is known for creating hip-hop itself in the 1970s. With the technique he created when mixing two identical records back and forth, he was able to make unique-sounding sounds that later gave birth to rap itself. In modern times, rap is used to bring awareness to problems such as racism and sexism. It developed communities in a culture regarding music.

=== Asia ===
==== Indonesia ====
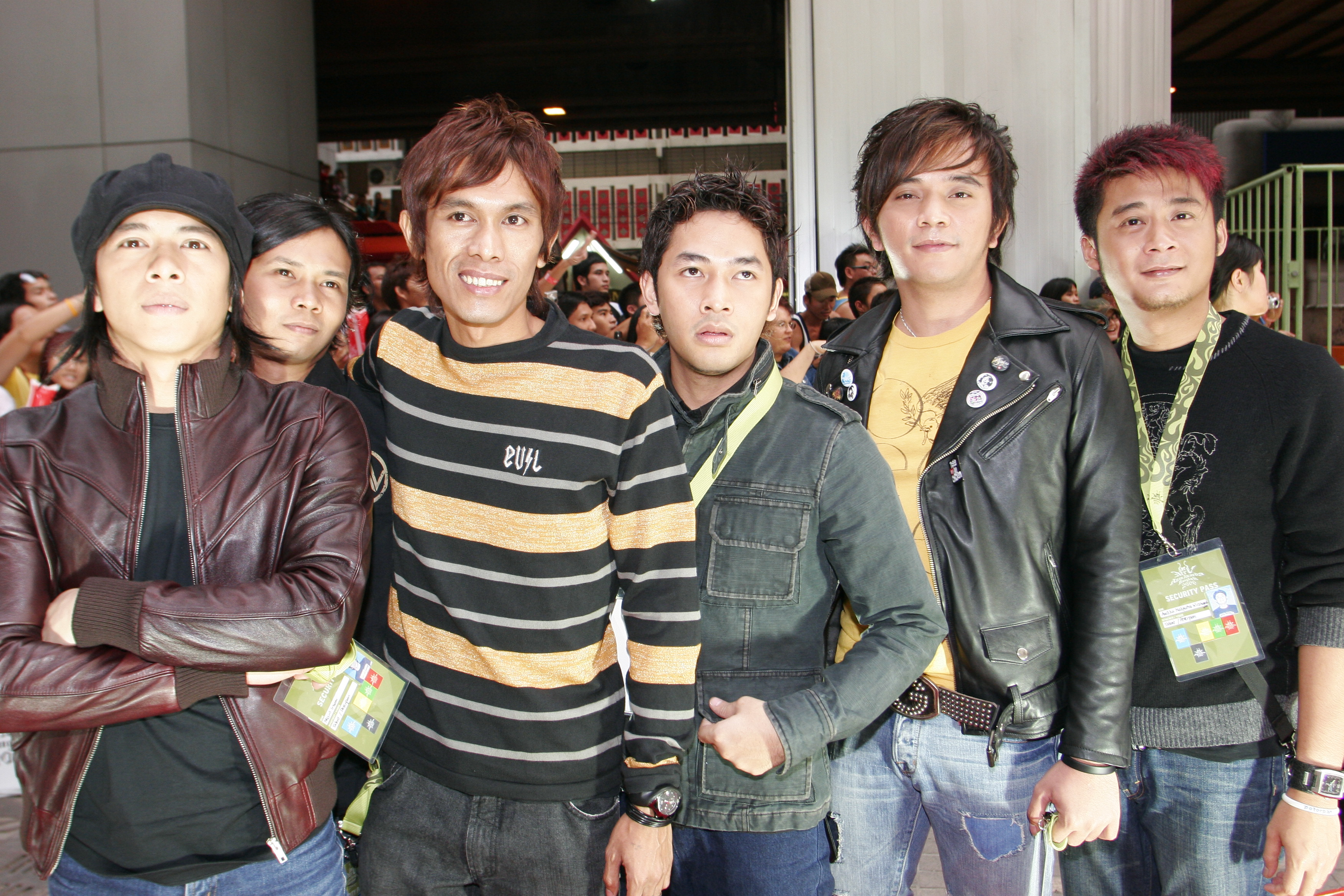
Noah, one of Indonesia's popular bands

Popular music in Indonesia is often categorized as hybrid forms of Western rock to genres that originated in Indonesia and are indigenous in style. The genre of music Dangdut is a genre of popular music specifically found in Indonesia. Dangdut formed from two other genres of popular music: indo pop and underground music coming together to create a new fusion genre. Dangdut takes the noisy instrumentation from underground music, but makes it easier to listen to, like indo pop. Dangdut attempts to form many popular music genres like rock, pop, and traditional music to create a new sound that lines up with the consumers' tastes. This genre has formed into a larger social movement that includes clothing, youth culture, the resurgence of Islam, and the capitalist entertainment industry.

Another music scene that is popular in Indonesia is punk rock. This genre was shaped in Indonesia by the local interpretations of the media from the larger global punk movement. Jeremy Wallach argues that while Green Day was seen as the "death of punk", in Indonesia they were seen catalyst for a larger punk movement. Punk in Indonesia calls on the English-speaking world to embrace the global sects of the punk subculture and become open-minded to the transnational genre.

==== China ====
In a 2015 study involving young students in Shanghai, youths stated they enjoyed listening to both Chinese, other Asian nationalities, and Anglo-American popular music. There are three ways that young people of China were able to access global music. The first reason was a policy change since the late 1970s where the country was opened up to the rest of the world instead of being self-contained. This created more opportunities for Chinese people to interact with people outside of their country of origin to create a more globalized culture. The second reason is that the Chinese television and music industry since the 1980s has broadcast television shows from their neighboring Asian societies and the West. The third reason is the impact of the internet and smartphones on the accessibility of streaming music.

In 2015, students in China accounted for 30.2% of China's internet population and the third and fifth most popular uses of the internet were respectively, internet music and internet video use. The youths described being able to connect to the emotions and language of the Chinese music, but also enjoyed the melodies found within Anglo-American music. The students also believed that listening to the English music would improve their English language skills.

==== Middle East ====
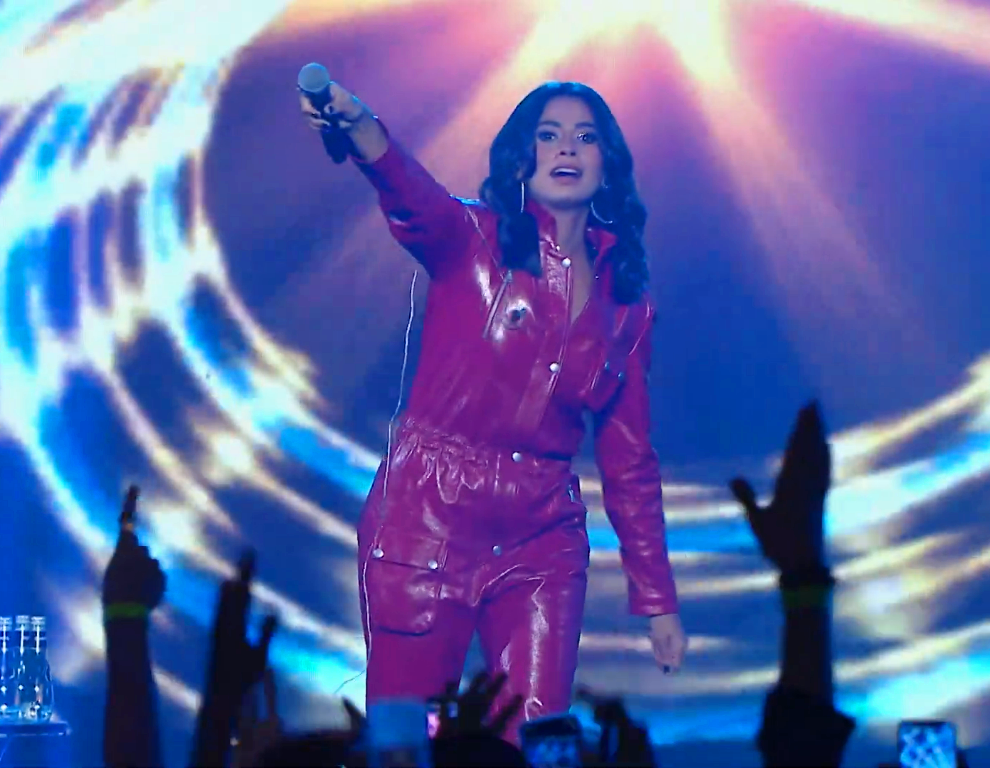
Ruby, Egyptian singer performing

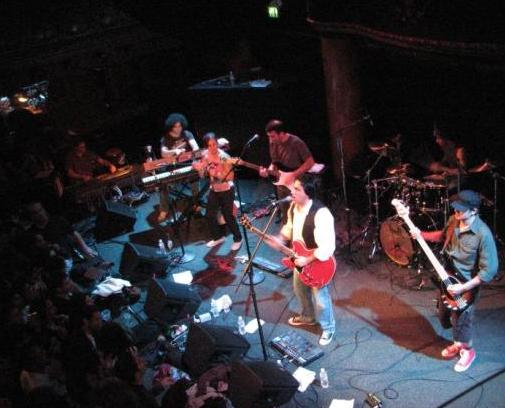
Iranian rock band Kiosk, live in 2007

Modernization of music in the Arab world involved borrowing inspiration from Turkish music and Western musical styles. The late Egyptian singer Umm Kulthum stated,

"We must respect ourselves and our art. The Indians have set a good example for us - they show great respect for themselves and their arts. Wherever they are, they wear their native dress and their music is known throughout the world. This is the right way."

She discussed this to explain why Egypt and the Arab world needed to take pride in the popular music styles originating in their culture so the styles were not lost in the modernization. Local musicians learned Western instrumental styles to create their own popular styles including their native languages and indigenous musical features. Communities in throughout the Arab world place high value on their indigenous musical identities while assimilating to new musical styles from neighboring countries or mass media. Through the 1980s and 1990s, popular music has been seen as a problem for the Iranian government because of the non-religious meanings within the music and the bodily movements of dancing or headbanging. During this time period, metal became a popular underground subculture through the Middle East. Just like their Western counterparts, Middle Eastern metal followers expressed their feelings of alienation. But their thoughts came from war and social restrictions on youth.

In interviews of Iranian teenagers between 1990 and 2004, the youth overall preferred Western popular music, even though it was banned by the government. Iranian underground rock bands are composed of members who are young, urban-minded, educated, relatively well-off, and global beings. Iranian rock is described by the traits that these band members possess. The youth who take part in underground music in the Middle East are aware of the social constraints of their countries, but they are not optimistic about social change. Iranian rock bands have taken up an internationalist position to express their rebellion from the discourses in their national governments.

== See also ==
- LGBTQ music
- List of honorific titles in popular music
- List of popular music genres
- List of popular music performers
- Music popularity index
- Music radio
- Popular culture
- Popular music pedagogy
- Volume!
