= Johannes Masing =

German jurisprudent and judge

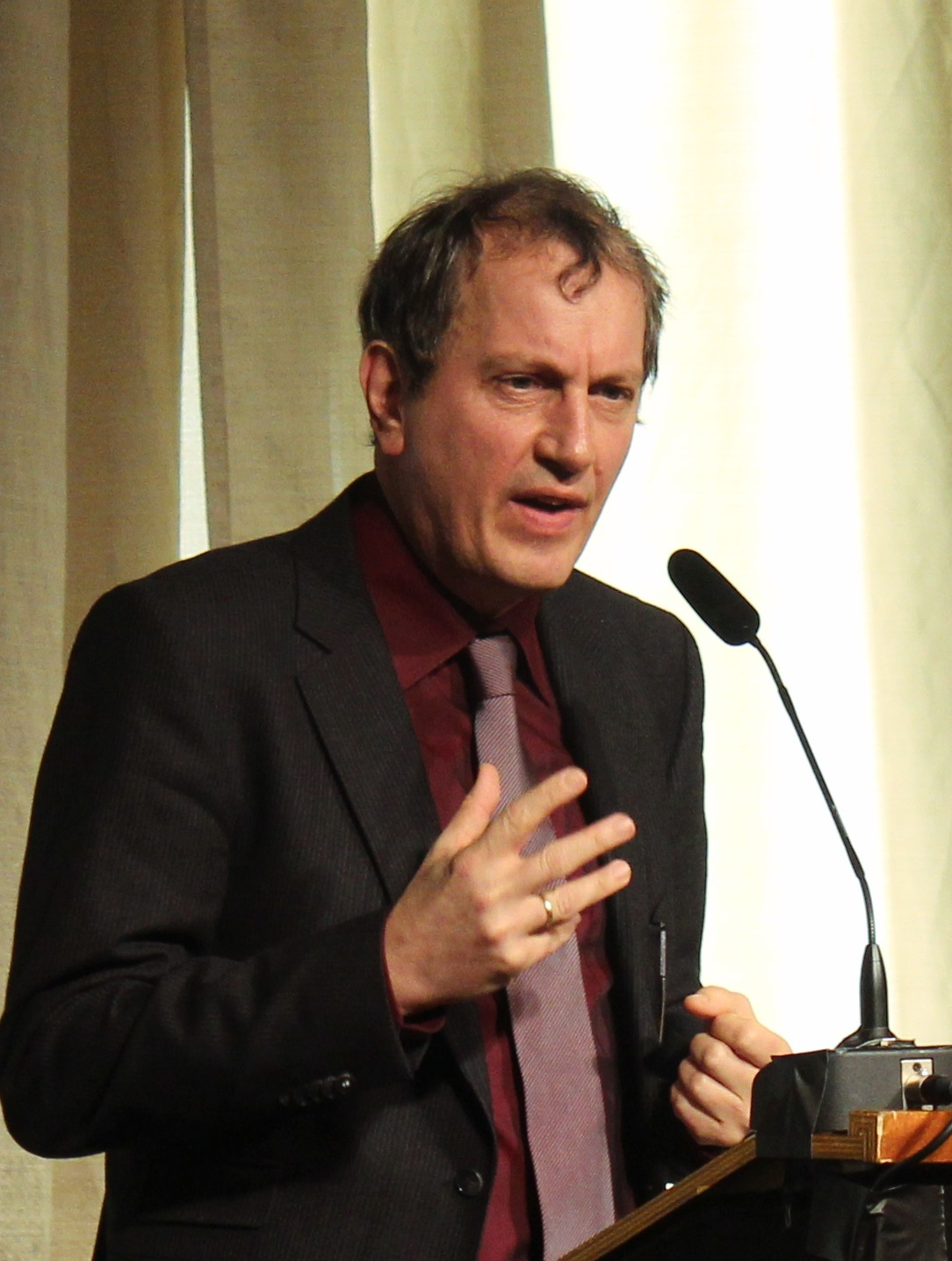
- Johannes Masing in 2014

Justice of the Federal Constitutional Court of Germany
- In office 2 April 2008 – 10 July 2020
- Nominated by: Social Democratic Party of Germany
- Preceded by: Wolfgang Hoffmann-Riem
- Succeeded by: Ines Härtel

Personal details
- Born: Johannes Masing; 9 January 1959 (age 67) Wiesbaden, Germany
- Education: University of Freiburg; Freiburg Conservatory of Music; State University of Music and Performing Arts Stuttgart

Johannes Masing (born 9 January 1959 in Wiesbaden) is a German jurisprudent, public law and former judge of the Federal Constitutional Court of Germany.

== Career ==
Between 1979 and 1986, Masing studied law and philosophy at the University of Freiburg as well as Piano at the Freiburg Conservatory of Music (Music teacher diploma) and the State University of Music and Performing Arts Stuttgart (Artistic final exam).

In 2002, Masing was a visiting scholar at the University of Michigan Law School, Ann Arbor/USA. Since 2007, he has been a full professor at the Faculty of Law of the University of Freiburg.

A nominee of the Social Democratic Party of Germany, on 15 February 2008 he was elected to succeed Wolfgang Hoffmann-Riem as sitting Justice of the Federal Constitutional Court of Germany in the court's first senate. He was inaugurated on 2 April 2008 and is chiefly responsible for constitutional complaints concerning data protection, privacy and the right to demonstrate.

In a unanimous 2014 decision by the eight-judge First Senate on abolishing a law allowing companies to be passed from generation to generation tax free, Masing – alongside fellow members Reinhard Gaier and Susanne Baer – issued a supplementary decision saying the judgment should have included wording to ensure that revised tax rules did not undercut the basic purpose of inheritance law, which was to hinder excessive concentration of wealth among a privileged few: “The inheritance tax serves not only to generate tax revenue. Rather it is also an instrument of the state to hinder disproportionate accumulation of wealth from generation to generation solely as a result of origin or personal connection.”

He was elected a member of the Academia Europaea in 2021.

== Other activities ==
- German Academic Scholarship Foundation, Board of Trustees
- Schwetzingen Festival, Member of the Board of Trustees

== Recognition ==
- 2008 – Gay-Lussac-Humboldt Prize for Franco-German Research Cooperation

== See also ==
Federal Constitutional Court of Germany
