= Brun-Otto Bryde =

German judge

Justice of the Federal Constitutional Court of Germany
- In office 23 January 2001 – 2 February 2011
- Nominated by: The Greens
- Preceded by: Jürgen Kühling
- Succeeded by: Susanne Baer

Personal details
- Born: Brun-Otto Bryde; 12 January 1943 (age 83) Hamburg, Germany
- Education: University of Hamburg

Brun-Otto Bryde (born 12 January 1943) is a German legal scholar and a former judge of the Federal Constitutional Court of Germany.

== Life ==
Bryde was born in Hamburg on 12 January 1943. Following his first state exam in law 1966 and his second one in 1969, he did his doctoral degree in Hamburg in 1971. After that he became an instructor at a university in Ethiopia. Between 1973 and 1974, he was a Law and Modernization Fellow at the Yale Law School. Later, from 1974 until 1982, he was a teacher at the university of Hamburg. In 1980, he did his habilitation and afterwards he became a professor at the University of the Bundeswehr Munich. Since 1987, he is a professor at the University of Giessen. He was a visiting professor two times at the University of Wisconsin Law School in 1989 and 1994 as well. Bryde was also a member of the Convention on the Elimination of All Forms of Racial Discrimination. From 2001 to 2011, he was a judge at the Federal Constitutional Court of Germany (1st. Senate). He was the first judge of the Federal Constitutional Court to be elected on the proposal of the Green party. He was succeeded by judge Susanne Baer.
