= Alexandra Kertz-Welzel =

German music educator (born 1970)

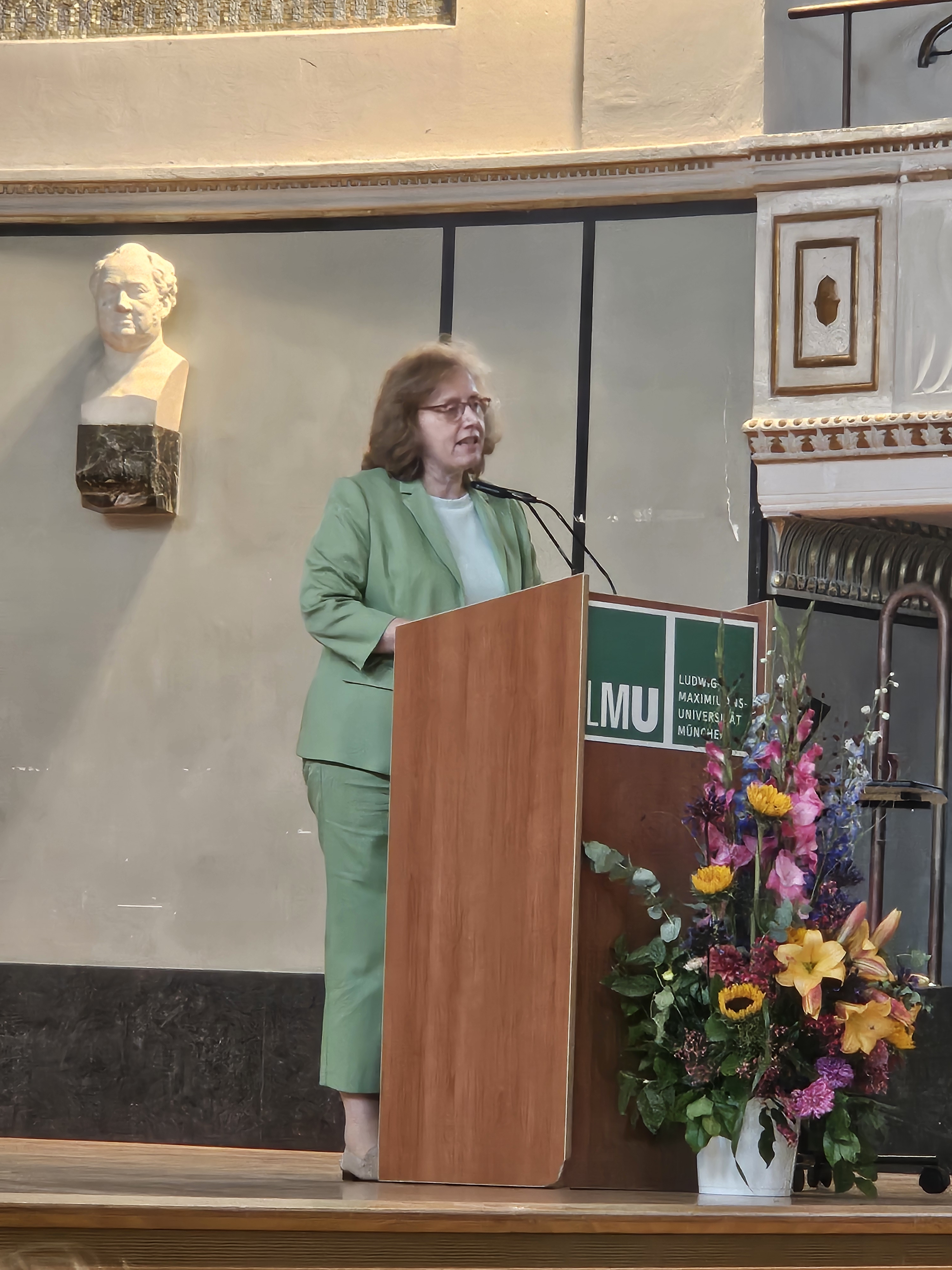
- Alexandra Kertz-Welzel
- Born: October 15, 1970 (age 55); Neunkirchen, Saarland, West Germany
- Education: Hochschule für Musik Saar
- Known for: Music Education, Philosophy of Music Education, Music Education Policy, Community Music, Children's Musical Cultures
- Scientific career
- Fields: Music education, comparative education, cultural policy
- Workplaces: LMU Munich
- Website: Website at LMU Munich, Germany

Alexandra Kertz-Welzel (born October 15, 1970) is professor and chair of music education at LMU Munich in Germany. She studied at the Hochschule für Musik Saar and Saarland University in Saarbrücken, where she obtained master's degrees in music education, German studies, philosophy, piano performance (class of Kristin Merscher), and harpsichord performance (class of Gerald Hambitzer), and was a scholarship holder from Cusanuswerk between 1992 and 2000. In 2000, she received a PhD degree in musicology from Saarland University, with a dissertation on aesthetics in literature and music during the early romanticism in the nineteenth century. Prior to her employment at LMU Munich in 2011, she was a lecturer in music education at the Hochschule für Musik in Saarbrücken (2005–2011), and visiting scholar and lecturer in music education at the University of Washington in Seattle, Washington (2002–2005).

== Publications ==
Kertz-Welzel is the author of Every child for music: Musikpädagogik und Musikunterricht in den USA (2006), Patriotism and nationalism in music education (2012, along with David G. Hebert), and Globalizing music education: a framework (2018). Chapters on internationalizing music education, music education policy, community music, and transcultural childhoods, have appeared in international journals and handbooks.

Kertz-Welzel has given lectures and keynotes at national and international conferences in Europe, Brazil, China, Nepal, and the United States.

== Professional memberships and activities ==
Kertz-Welzel was co-chair of the ISME Commission on Policy: Culture, Education and Media from 2016 to 2018 of the International Society for Music Education (ISME), and chair of the International Society for the Philosophy of Music Education (ISPME) from 2017-2019. Additionally, she is editorial board member of international peer-reviewed journals, such as the Philosophy of Music Education Review, or the Journal of Historical Research in Music Education. At LMU Munich, she was Excellence Initiative mentor at the Faculty of History and the Arts from 2011 to 2017. In 2013, she founded the Munich Community Music Center (MCMC) at LMU Munich. From 2018 to 2020, she was the executive director of the College of Arts at LMU Munich.

== Books ==
- Kertz-Welzel, Alexandra (2018). Globalizing music education: a framework. Bloomington: Indiana University Press. ISBN 978-0-253-03258-4
- Hebert, David; Kertz-Welzel, Alexandra (2012). Patriotism and Nationalism in Music Education. New York: Ashgate/Routledge. ISBN 978-1409430803.
- Kertz-Welzel, Alexandra (2006). Every child for music: Musikpädagogik und Musikunterricht in den USA. Essen: Blaue Eule. OCLC 162226927. ISBN 978-3-8992-4169-3
- Kertz-Welzel, Alexandra (2001). Die Transzendenz der Gefühle. Beziehungen zwischen Musik und Gefühl bei Wackenroder/Tieck und die Musikästhetik der Romantik. Sankt Ingbert: Röhrig Universitätsverlag. OCLC 964260038. ISBN 978-3-86110-278-6
