= MayDay Group =

Music education think-tank

The MayDay Group (MDG) is an international think-tank of music educators, and the main alternative to NAfME since its founding in the 1990s. Founded in 1993 by Thomas A. Regelski and J. Terry Gates, MDG publishes two peer-reviewed journals, Action, Criticism, and Theory for Music Education, and TOPICS for Music Education Praxis, and have held yearly colloquia since 1993. MDG colloquia are based on the Action Ideals, provoking music educators to further critical thought.
