= Music popularity index =

A music popularity index is a recorded music ranking, classified by popularity, which can be measured in many different ways. Nowadays, they are very common in musical websites, since they offer useful statistics suitable for many applications, such as musical recommendations. There are hundreds of methods to measure the popularity of an artist, and most websites have their own measurement system. The leading systems are as follows:

== Last.fm music charts ==
=== Features ===
Last.fm is Internet's reference to musical social networks. It has a huge database, based on all the information provided by their users when they listen to music in different ways, storing all the information in their profiles.

Every week, Last.fm updates its music charts, based on all the information stored last week by the millions of users through the Audioscrobbler plug-in or the Last.fm radio. The website has many different charts, including Top Artists, Top Tracks, Top Albums, Weekly Top Artists and Weekly Top Tracks. The Top Tracks and the Top Albums of an artist are also available. In a user's profile we have his/her Top Tracks and Top Artists. All these information can be classified in different time periods, such as last week, last month, last 3 months, last 6 months, last year or overall.

=== Main problems and uprising solutions ===
Since the generated music charts depend on what the users register and on the tags from their music files, Last.fm made up a system based on the listens of the users which corrects a song's tag if it differs from what most people registered. On the other hand, the system has errors, like not noticing the difference between two artists with the same name or not taking track length into consideration. Artists with many short tracks will have many more listens than artists with a few but very long ones.

== ReverbNation's Band Equity ==
=== Features ===
The website ReverbNation also has joined the great amount of uprising musical social networks, contributing with their particular version. They developed a system to measure artists' popularity called Band Equity.

Band Equity measures popularity taking into account the interaction between the artist and the fans or listeners. Any artist registered in ReverbNation is measured automatically and the score is tracked over time. Band Equity compares artists with similar styles, so their progress can be benchmarked.

=== What It Measures ===
- Reach: The number of unique people reached by the artist, found in social networks, blogs, home pages, etc. It takes into account the unique listeners, watchers of videos, registered fans, fans in the mailing list, etc. It could be described as the total potential fan base, and captures an element of effort on the part of the artist and their fans to spread their content and reach more people.
- Influence: Measures the reaction of those exposed to the artists' content. It takes into account the number of songs or videos played per listener, play-through percentage on songs, the total engagement time, etc. It could be described as the merit of the artist's content.
- Access: The ability of the artist to access those fans directly, and message to them. This factor includes the rate at which listeners/friends convert to registered fans of the Artist or joining their mailing list, giving the Artist the ability to speak to them directly. It could be described as the familiarity the Artist has with their fan base.
- Recency: All of the factors before must be weighted by how they have occurred in time. Because of this, Band Equity can be used as a way to identify how promotional strategies affect fan relationships in the aggregate, helping to understand the reason behind and artist's popularity.

== BBC's Sound Index ==
This was in beta testing during mid-2008, but closed down in July of that year. As of 2011 the website still shows the beta trial as closed.

The BBC created its own system called Sound Index, which measured the popularity of the top 1000 artists, based on discussions taken from: Bebo, Last.fm, Google Groups, iTunes, Myspace and YouTube. The index updated every 6 hours, so it was easy to appreciate fluctuations in popularity. The more blog mentions, comments, listens, downloads or profile views an artist or track had the higher up in the Sound Index they were. The system also allowed the information to be filtered by sources, allowing an index only based on information coming from Last.fm, for example.
