= Charles Leonhard =

American music educator and academic (1915–2002)

Charles Leonhard (December 8, 1915 - January 31, 2002) was an American music educator and academic. He was one of the first to argue for a focus upon aesthetic education within music education. For most of his career, he was a professor at the University of Illinois at Urbana-Champaign.

== Life and career ==
Born in Anadarko, Oklahoma, Leonhard was the son of Morris and Dora McRae Leonhard. He was educated at the University of Oklahoma (Bachelor of Music in piano) and Teachers College, Columbia University (Master of Arts and Doctor of Education). Many of Leonhard's teachers were former students of John Dewey, whose ideas influenced Leonhard throughout his career. During his doctoral program, Leonhard studied aesthetics with Susanne Langer. In 1953, as the music education profession was just beginning to rethink its philosophy, Leonhard published his article "Music Education—Aesthetic Education." In this article, Leonhard urged music educators to eschew the instrumental values of music education and to stress the aesthetic value of music.

While a graduate student, Leonhard concurrently worked as an instructor and assistant professor of music education at Teachers College. He had previously served in the United States Army during World War II as a field artillery officer. In 1951 he joined the faculty of the University of Illinois at Urbana-Champaign where he was appointed professor of music and education, and chair of the graduate program in music education. He was the primary advisor on nearly 100 doctoral dissertations, including those of Eunice Boardman and Wayne Bowman. In addition to Bowman, many important philosophers of music education can trace their lineage back to Leonhard. For example, Bennett Reimer was a student at Illinois who worked with Leonhard and Harry Broudy. Reimer later went on to supervise the dissertations of David J. Elliott and Paul Woodford.

In 1986 Leonhard retired from his position at the University of Illinois. In 1988 he was appointed the Director of Research at the National Arts Education Research Center; a post he held through 1994. He died in 2002 at the age of 86. He had been married to Patricia Hagman since 1950. The couple had two children together.

== Important Contributions ==
In 1958, Leonhard's essay on evaluation appeared in Basic Concepts in Music Education. Along with his student, Robert House, Leonhard published Foundations and Principles of Music Education in 1959. In 1963, Leonhard and Richard Colwell initiated the Bulletin of the Council for Research in Music Education. In 1964, Leonhard was a presenter at the Seminar on Comprehensive Musicianship. In the 1970s, Leonhard edited a series of books called Contemporary Perspectives in Music Education. The series aimed to establish “a pattern for music teacher education based on the areas of knowledge and processes involved in music education rather than on the levels and specializations in music education.” According to Leonhard, the “mastery of all of these processes and areas of knowledge is essential for the successful music educator regardless of his area of specialization and the level at which he teaches.” Six titles were published:

- A Philosophy of Music Education by Bennett Reimer
- Building Instructional Programs in Music Education by Robert Sidnell
- The Psychology of Music Teaching by Edwin Gordon
- Administration of Music Education by Robert House
- The Evaluation of Music Teaching and Learning by Richard Colwell
- Experimental Research in Music by Clifford K. Madsen and Charles H. Madsen, Jr.
- Contact:+2348138101904

== Recognition as a Leader in the Field ==
In 1994, the Music Educators National Conference (MENC) placed Leonhard's name alongside those of William Billings, Lowell Mason, Frances Elliot Clark, Karl Gehrkens, Mabelle Glenn, James Mursell, Lilla Belle Pitts, and Allen Britton in the MENC Hall of Fame. Mark and Gary acknowledge the importance of Leonhard's contributions to the history of music education in the United States. David J. Elliott puts Leonhard in the company of Peter W. Dykema, Karl Gehrkens, James Mursell, Lilla Belle Pitts, Harry Broudy, Abraham Schwadron, Bennett Reimer, and Keith Swanwick as leading thinkers in music education.
