= Jere T. Humphreys =

American music scholar, researcher, and professor

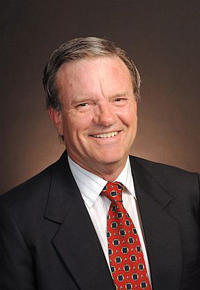
- Born: March 26, 1949; Tennessee, USA
- Education: University of Mississippi; Florida State University; University of Michigan
- Spouse: Alexandra Houzouri Humphreys
- Awards: MENC Citation of Excellence in Research, Distinguished Service Award, and Senior Researcher Award for lifetime achievement Fulbright Senior Scholar and Fulbright Senior Specialist (x2)
- Scientific career
- Fields: Music Education
- Workplaces: Arizona State University; West Virginia University; Huntingdon College
- Military career
- Allegiance: United States of America
- Branch: United States Army
- Rank: Specialist E-5
- Unit: U.S. Army National Guard
- Website: isearch.asu.edu/profile/198

Jere T. Humphreys (born March 26, 1949, in Tennessee) is an American music scholar who applies historical, quantitative, philosophical, and sociological research methods to music education and arts business.

== Education ==
Humphreys holds a B.M. in music education from the University of Mississippi, an M.M. in clarinet performance from Florida State University, and a Ph.D. in music education from the University of Michigan.

== Teaching ==
Humphreys has been a professor in the School of Music at Arizona State University (ASU) since 1987. Previously, he taught at West Virginia University and Huntingdon College (Montgomery, Alabama), and in the Mississippi public schools.

He has had a career as a lecturer, consultant, and presenter in 31 countries across six continents and 40 U.S. states. He taught in the Georgia Governors Honors Program, served as an academic specialist in Eastern Europe for the U.S. Information Agency (Department of State), and taught residential courses at Northern Illinois University, the University of South Florida, and the University of Michigan. He held an endowed chair residency at the University of Alabama and completed residencies in universities outside the United States in Argentina, Bulgaria, Greece, Kosovo, Macedonia, Turkey, and the United Kingdom. He has been an instructor and dissertation advisor for the Native American Educational Leadership Ed.D. program in the ASU College of Education and for the D.M.A. program in music education at Boston University. Worldwide, he has been a dissertation and thesis advisor, committee member, and external reviewer for institutions in Australia, Eastern and Western Europe, and North and South America. Altogether, he has advised 44 doctoral dissertations and two master's theses, including several university and national award winners. He has been nominated for ASU Professor of the Year, ASU Distinguished Mentor of Women, and ASU College of Fine Arts Distinguished Teacher of the Year awards.

== Research ==
Humphreys has more than 175 publications and translations in nine languages (Arabic, Bulgarian, Bosnian/Croatian/Serbian, English, Greek, Macedonian, Mandarin, Spanish, Turkish), including chapters and articles in books and journals, the Grove Dictionary of American Music, and Sage Directions in Educational Psychology—a republication of works by leading scholars in educational psychology and measurement (e.g., Bruner, Chronbach, Glaser, Nunnally, Piaget, Rogers, Stanley, Robert Thorndike). He has received three research awards from the National Association for Music Education: an MENC Citation of Excellence in Research (1985), a Distinguished Service Award "for exceptional contributions to scholarship" from the MENC History Special Research Interest Group (2010), and the MENC Senior Researcher Award for lifetime achievement (2006), the highest research award in the field of music education. Humphreys is a Fulbright Senior Scholar (Macedonia 2002) and Fulbright Senior Specialist (Egypt 2010, Turkey 2015) who has presented 18 keynote and other major speeches worldwide. As a member of the Senior Editorial Board and the contributing editor for music education for the second edition of the Grove Dictionary of American Music (Oxford University Press), Humphreys commissioned and oversaw the writing/revising/editing of approximately 350 articles related to music education and music therapy. He was also a section (part) editor and author for the Oxford Handbook of Music Education (2012 and 2018 editions). He has served as editor of the Journal of Historical Research in Music Education and on the editorial committees of 16 education, music education, and music therapy research journals. He has collaborated with the Morrison Institute for Public Policy and the U.S. National Endowment for the Arts (consultant); Greek Ministry of Education, European Union, and U.S. National Endowment for the Humanities (member of research teams); and Social Sciences and Humanities Research Council of Canada and the U.S. Fulbright Specialist Program, World Learning (reviewer).

== Professional and Community Service ==
Humphreys has served as a university accreditation evaluator in Canada and held leadership positions in the College Music Society (Advisory Committee for Music Education), Fulbright Association Arizona Chapter (Board of Directors member and co-president), Greek Society for Music Education (Scientific Advisor), International Society for Music Education (Financial Advisory Committee), MENC (Hall of Fame Board, Executive Committee for Society for Research in Music Education, Executive Committee for Society for Music Teacher Education, National Chair for History Special Research Interest Group, chair for MENC Centennial History Symposium), University of Michigan School of Music, Theatre & Dance Alumni Society (Board of Governors), and others. Outside of academia Humphreys served in the U.S. Army National Guard (rank: Specialist E-5). For eight years he sat on boards of directors for the American Civil Liberties Union of Arizona, where he served as vice-president for nominating and governance, vice-president for personnel, and chair of the Bylaws Committee. A Habitat for Humanity (HFH) volunteer since 1998, he has been a construction house/block leader (or co-leader) for 41 builds with HFH Central Arizona, Jimmy & Rosalynn Carter HFH Work Projects (including a rehabilitation project for Hurricane Katrina relief on the Mississippi Gulf Coast), and Blitz Home Builders. He has participated in dozens of other HFH projects, including a Global Village build in Belfast, Northern Ireland. Beginning in 2002, he worked with HFH International founding president (the late) Millard Fuller to found HFH Macedonia, an award-winning affiliate that to date has helped more than 6,000 families. In 2014, HFH Macedonia dedicated its first new building to Humphreys, six condominiums in Veles, Macedonia. He continues as an honorary (fundraising) member of the board of directors. In 2018, he received a Spirit of Philanthropy Award from the Association of Fundraising Professionals—Greater Arizona Chapter.

== Selected publications ==
*Originally a keynote or other featured speech

- Schiff, Jelena Dj. Simonović, and Jere T. Humphreys. “Claude V. Palisca as Music Educator: The Yale Seminar on Music Education and the Norton Anthology of Western Music.” Journal of Historical Research in Music Education. In press.
- *"World Music: Bringing Harmony to Our (Flawed) World" (a keynote speech presented at a world music symposium at Northern Illinois University in April 2015). Video and audio recordings available at Arizona State University Digital Repository.
- *"Energizing the “Birge Story” of Public School Music in the United States: Some Ideas on How to Amp It Up." Journal of Historical Research in Music Education 36, no. 2 (April 2015): 91-109.
- *"Relationships between Popular Music and Democracy: Implications for Popular Music Pedagogy," with Abstract in the Mandarin. Music Education Research International 6 (2013): 1–14. Available at Arizona State University Digital Repository. Chinese (Mandarin) version (trans. Jui-Ching Wang): Journal of Aesthetic Education 198 (2014): 4–11 (Republic of China—Taiwan). Available at Arizona State University Digital Repository.
- *"Change in Music Education: The Paradigmatic and the Praxial." The Journal of the Desert Skies Symposium on Research in Music Education 2013 Proceedings (University of Arizona, 2013): 49–68. Available at Arizona State University Digital Repository.
- "Observations about Occupational Identity among Public School Music Teachers: Past and Present." In Advances in Social-Psychology and Music Education Research, SEMPRE Studies in the Psychology of Music Series, ed. Patrice Madura Ward-Steinman, 127–38. Surrey, England; Burlington, VT: Ashgate, 2011. Paperback edition: New York: Routledge, Taylor & Francis Group, 2016.
- "United States of America: Reflections on the Development and Effectiveness of Compulsory Music Education." In The Origins and Foundations of Music Education: Cross-Cultural Historical Studies in Compulsory Schooling, eds. Gordon Cox and Robin Stevens, 121–36. Continuum Studies in Educational Research. London and New York: Continuum International Publishing Group, 2010. Second [English] edition: The Origins and Foundations of Music Education: International Perspectives, 139–53. London: Bloomsbury Academic, 2016. Chinese [Mandarin] language (reprint) edition, Beijing, China: University of Peking Press, January 2016.
- Stamou, Lelouda, Charles P. Schmidt, and Jere T. Humphreys. "Standardization of the Gordon Primary Measures of Music Audiation in Greece." Journal of Research in Music Education 58, no. 1 (April 2010): 75–89.
- Androutsos, Polyvios, and Jere T. Humphreys. "Classroom Observation Ability among Pre-service Music Educators in Greece." International Journal of Music Education 28, no. 1 (February 2010): 5–16.
- Wang, Jui-Ching, and Jere T. Humphreys. "Multicultural and Popular Music Content in an American Music Teacher Education Program." International Journal of Music Education 27, no. 1 (February 2009): 19–36.
- *"2006 Senior Researcher Award Acceptance Address: Observations about Music Education Research in MENC’s First and Second Centuries." Journal of Research in Music Education 54, no. 3 (Fall 2006): 183–202.
- *"Toward a Reconstruction of ‘Creativity’ in Music Education." "Points for Debate" article. British Journal of Music Education 23, no. 3 (November 2006): 351–61. Mandarin version (trans. Jui-Ching Wang): Journal of Aesthetic Education 158 (2007): 4–13. (Republic of China—Taiwan). Available at Arizona State University Digital Repository.
- "Popular Music in the American Schools: What the Past Tells Us about the Present and the Future." In Bridging the Gap: Popular Music and Music Education, ed. Carlos Xavier Rodriguez, 91–105. Reston, VA: MENC: The National Association for Music Education, 2004.
- *"Some Notions, Stories, and Tales about Music and Education in Society: The Coin's Other Side." Journal of Historical Research in Music Education 23, no. 2 (April 2002): 137–57.
- "Musical Aptitude Testing: From James McKeen Cattell to Carl Emil Seashore." Research Studies in Music Education 10 (June 1998): 42–53. Reprint in: SAGE Directions in Educational Psychology, ed. Neil J. Salkind, 1763–82, SAGE Library of Educational Thought and Practice, Vol. V, pp. 115–30 (Chap. 78), Section IV: "Research Design, Measurement and Statistics and Evaluation." London: SAGE Publications, 2010.
- Humphreys, Jere T., and Charles P. Schmidt. "Membership of the Music Educators National Conference from 1912–1938: A Demographic and Economic Analysis." Bulletin of the Council for Research in Music Education no. 137 (Summer 1998): 16–31.
- "Sex and Geographic Representation in Two Music Education History Books." Bulletin of the Council for Research in Music Education no. 131 (Winter 1997): 67–86.
- *"Expanding the Horizons of Music Education History and Sociology." Quarterly Journal of Music Teaching and Learning 7, nos. 2–4 (1996/97): 5–19. Available at Visions of Research in Music Education 16, no. 7 (October 2010). Available at Arizona State University Digital Repository. Spanish version, La Expansión de los Horizontes de la Historia Y Sociología de la Educacion Musical (trans. Ana Lucia Frega and Carolina Cecilia Abbamonte): CIEM (Centro de Investigación en Educación Musical): Boletín de Investigación Educativo-Musical del Collegium Musicum de Buenos Aires 11, no. 31 (Abril de 2004): 5–18. Available at Arizona State University Digital Repository.
- Bužarovski, Dimitrije, Humphreys, Jere T. and Barry Wells. "College Students Attitudes Toward Music." PMEA Bulletin of Research in Music Education 21 (Fall 1995/1996): 20–42. Available at Arizona State University Digital Repository
- "Precursors of Musical Aptitude Testing: From the Greeks through the Work of Francis Galton." Journal of Research in Music Education 41, no. 4 (Winter 1993): 315–27. Available at Edwin E. Gordon Archive, University of South Carolina, Columbia. Reprint in: Music Education Research: An Anthology from the Journal of Research in Music Education, ed. Harry E. Price, 158–70. Reston, VA: Music Educators National Conference, 1998.
- *"Instrumental Music in American Education: In Service of Many Masters." In The Ithaca Conference on American Music Education: Centennial Profiles, ed. Mark Fonder, 25–51. Ithaca, NY: Ithaca College, 1992. Available at Arizona State University Digital Repository. Reprint in: Journal of Band Research 30, no. 2 (Spring 1995): 39–70. Available through [ProQuest] Periodicals Archive Online.
- "An Overview of American Public School Bands and Orchestras before World War II." Bulletin of the Council for Research in Music Education no. 101 (Summer 1989): 50–60.
- "Applications of Science: The Age of Standardization and Efficiency in Music Education." Bulletin of Historical Research in Music Education 9, no. 1 (January 1988): 1–21.
- "The Child-Study Movement and Public School Music Education." Journal of Research in Music Education 33, no. 2 (Summer 1985): 79–86.
