= Axel Theimer =

Conductor, composer, singer, professor

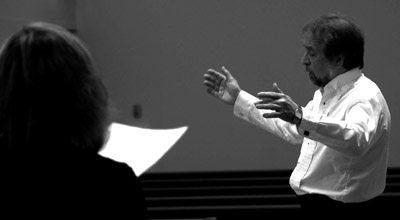
Axel Theimer conducting Kantorei, a professional choir based in Minneapolis/Saint Paul, Minnesota.

Axel Theimer (/ˈɑːksɛl ˈtaɪmər/; born March 10, 1946) is a conductor, composer, singer, author and professor at the College of Saint Benedict/Saint John's University (CSB/SJU) in Minnesota. He conducts the professional a cappella choir Kantorei (Minneapolis/Saint Paul), the National Catholic Youth Choir and the Amadeus Chamber Symphony, and as of 2020 is in his 52nd year as a music faculty member at CSB/SJU, where he conducts CSB/SJU Chamber Choir and the SJU Men's Chorus. He is on the faculty and is executive director of the VoiceCare Network. He is an acknowledged expert on healthy vocal production for solo and choral singing, and the effect of conducting gesture on vocalists and instrumentalists. His choirs are known and praised for their particularly warm, natural, expressive and efficient sound.

== Biography ==
=== Early life ===
Theimer was born in 1946 in the village of Sankt Johann in Tirol in the State of Tyrol, Austria. His parents managed a retreat camp in the Austrian Alps for children from the nearby city of Innsbruck. In the farm-like setting, Theimer's earliest exposure to music included singing folksongs around the campfire, while hiking, and at evening gatherings.

Theimer began taking piano lessons at age four in the village of St. Johann, about an hour's walk down the mountainside every other week.

=== Education ===
Theimer was accepted into the training choir of the Vienna Boys’ Choir at age seven and joined one of the touring choirs at age nine. He was a member of the choir until age 14. During those years he toured Europe, South Africa, Rhodesia, Mozambique and, twice (1958 and 1960) the United States. The tour in 1958 included a concert at Saint John's University in Collegeville, Minnesota.

After completing his time with the boys’ choir, he finished his high school education (Realgymnasium) with the matura while also continuing his piano studies and singing with several choral groups in Vienna, including the Jeunesse Musicale and the Zusatzchor at the Vienna State Opera. After high school he was a student at the University of Veterinary Medicine Vienna until he moved to the United States to begin his tenure on the music faculty at CSB/SJU.

Theimer holds a Bachelor of Arts degree from Saint John's University (1971). He received a Master of Fine Arts in choral conducting (1974) and Doctor of Musical Arts in vocal performance (1984) from the University of Minnesota, where he was a student of Tom Lancaster and Roy Schuessler.

== Career ==
=== Conducting ===
While living in Vienna, Theimer conducted the Chorus Viennensis, the adult performing partner ensemble to the Vienna Boys’ Choir, for two years. In 1969, SJU Men's Chorus director Gerhardt Track recommended Theimer to succeed him as the choral director at Saint John's University. Theimer arrived in Minnesota that summer.

Theimer has conducted the SJU Men's Chorus since joining the faculty at Saint John's University in 1969. In the same year, he also organized the first mixed choir for students of the College of Saint Benedict (a college for women) and Saint John's University (a college for men), which evolved into the CSB/SJU Chamber Choir, now one of the major touring ensembles of the combined CSB/SJU music department.

In 1984 Theimer founded the Amadeus Chamber Symphony, a community chamber orchestra for central Minnesota musicians and audiences. The orchestra plays a full concert season each year and participates in annual Christmas at Saint John’s and other concerts involving CSB/SJU choral ensembles. The orchestra also hosts several community and youth partnership concerts each season.

Since 1988, Theimer has conducted Kantorei /ˈkɑːntɔːraɪ/, a professional choir specializing in 19th- and 20th-century a cappella music from central Europe. The choir is known throughout the Midwest for its distinctively effortless sound, warm blend and expressive interpretation. It has been praised for reflecting the emotional content of both text and music. Kantorei presents concerts at churches in the Minneapolis/Saint Paul area and collaborates with schools as a part of its “Singing for a Lifetime” educational outreach program. Kantorei has been featured on Classical Minnesota Public Radio (KSJN), A Prairie Home Companion, and Twin Cities Public Television, and has produced five CD recordings. While its main repertoire is a cappella choral music, Kantorei has collaborated with the Minnesota Orchestra, Saint Paul Chamber Orchestra, Minnesota Sinfonia and Minnesota Chorale during its 22 seasons. Kantorei is not affiliated with the choir of the same name based in Denver, Colorado, or the boys’ choir of the same name based in Rockford, Illinois.

Since 2000, Theimer has been music director of the National Catholic Youth Choir, a choir for Roman Catholic high school students from across the United States that meets each summer at Saint John's University.

Theimer has conducted all-state choirs, choral festivals, and honor choirs throughout the United States, Canada and Asia, and has presented master classes, workshops and seminars for state, regional and national music conventions and conferences, including ACDA, MENC, VCDA (Virginia Choral Directors Association) Senior Honors Choir Director MMEA, OKMEA, and NPM. His annual Impact Course offered by the VoiceCare Network has attracted choir directors, classroom teachers, singers and others interested in the human voice and human compatible learning/teaching, from around the world.

=== Solo and recital career ===
Theimer is an active solo performer and recitalist. He regularly sings with Pastiche, an ensemble of the music faculty at CSB/SJU. His solo recitals, while focusing frequently on the art song repertoire by Beethoven, Brahms, Frederick Loewe, Franz Schubert, Robert Schumann, Richard Strauss and Hugo Wolf, also include major literature by Samuel Barber, Gabriel Fauré, Gerald Finzi, Bohuslav Martinů, Francis Poulenc, Peter Warlock and others. With guitarist O. Nicholas Raths, he has produced two solo recordings of Austrian folksongs.

Theimer also frequently appears as a baritone soloist with choirs and orchestras for oratorio performances, including everything from J.S. Bach’s St. John’s Passion to the CSB/SJU and St. Cloud State University music departments’ 2008 presentation of Stephen Paulus’s Holocaust memorial oratorio To Be Certain of the Dawn.

=== Teaching ===
At CSB/SJU, Theimer teaches applied voice, vocal pedagogy, choral conducting and other related courses.

=== Writings ===
Theimer is co-author of several chapters in Bodymind and Voice: Foundations of Voice Education, co-edited by Dr. Leon Thurman and Dr. Graham Welch. The book is used as vocal pedagogy text in universities in the United States, Canada, Australia and Great Britain.

He has been the director of the VoiceCare Network, a professional association offering seminars and training to music educators, choral conductors, voice teachers and singers.

=== Awards ===
In November 2001 Theimer was named Choir Director of the Year by Minnesota American Choral Directors Association (ACDA-MN). He received the Alumni Achievement Award from Saint John's University in 1997 and, in 2004, was inducted to the Minnesota Music Educators Association (MMEA) Hall of Fame. In 2011, Theimer received the ACDA-MN F. Melius Christiansen Lifetime Achievement Award.

== Music ==
=== Compositions ===
Theimer's choral compositions and arrangements are published by Alliance Publications in Wisconsin. Some titles are listed here:

- A Red, Red Rose - SSAA
- Alma Redemptoris Mater - SSAATTBB
- Ave Maria - SSAA
- Cantate Domino / O Bone Jesu - TTBB a cap
- Christmas Motet - SAB a cap
- From Tomorrow On - SATB
- Gaudeamus Igitur - TTBB
- Hodie Christus Natus Est - TTB a cap
- I Did Not Die - SSA/Piano
- Lullaby, Jesus, My Dear One - Unison/Violin/Piano or SATB
- Lullaby, Oh, Lullaby - Unison Choir
- Magnificat - SSAATTBB
- Mass - SSAA (treble choir)/organ
- Missa Brevis - TTBB
- O Come, Let Us Adore Him - SATB+Solo a cap
- O Magnum Mysterium - SATB/Brass Quintet
- Psalm 130 - SATB
- See the World through Children's Eyes - SSA
- She Walks In Beauty - SATB + Piano
- The Birds - SSA/Baritone
- The Eyes of All - SSAA
- The Holly and the Ivy - TTBB
- Tu Est Petrus - SATB/Brass 5
- The Star-Spangled Banner - TTBB
- Three Songs from Asia - SATB
- Vere Languores Nostros - SSA + SATB/Organ
- What Shall I Give - Unison/Piano or SATB
- What Wondrous Love Is This - TTB
