= Bulletin of the Council for Research in Music Education =

- Discipline: Music education
- Language: English
- Edited by: Janet R. Barrett

Publication details
- Former name(s): Council of Research in Music Education
- History: 1963–present
- Publisher: University of Illinois Press on behalf of the Council for Research in Music Education
- Frequency: Quarterly

Standard abbreviations
- ISO 4: Bull. Counc. Res. Music Educ.

Indexing
- ISSN: 0010-9894
- LCCN: sf79010478
- JSTOR: 00109894
- OCLC no.: 01565242

Links
- Journal homepage; Online access

The Bulletin of the Council for Research in Music Education is a quarterly academic journal covering music education. It is published by the University of Illinois Press on behalf of the Council for Research in Music Education.

== History ==
The journal was established in 1963 by Charles Leonhard and Richard J. Colwell at the University of Illinois at Urbana–Champaign as Council of Research in Music Education and obtained its current name in the following year.

The initial volume was published as part of "plans for an organization to encourage research in music education [which had] been in process for more than a year." Its contents reflected two perceived needs for research in music education: (a) the need "for a means through which interest may be stimulated, guidance may be given, and some actual assistance offered to would-be researchers," and (b) the need "of disseminating information concerning research which has already taken place, whose findings the teacher may utilize in teaching, this being, after all, the basic purpose of such research."

== Scope ==
The journal focuses mainly on quantitative and qualitative studies in music education, but also publishes invited essays, book reviews, dissertation reviews, and conference proceedings. Notable contributors include Harry Broudy, Elliot W. Eisner, David J. Elliott, Howard Gardner, Edwin E. Gordon, Janet Mills, and Bennett Reimer.

== Editors ==
The founding editor-in-chief was Richard J. Colwell, who edited the journal (vols. 1–44 & 48–103). Other editors have included Marilyn P. Zimmerman (vols. 104–124), Eunice Boardman (vols. 118–139), John W. Grashel (vols. 119–146), Deborah A. Sheldon (vols. 144–150), Gregory F. DeNardo (vols. 151–189), and Eve Harwood (interim editor, vols. 190–197). The current editor is Janet R. Barrett.

== Abstracting and indexing ==
The journal is abstracted and indexed in the Arts & Humanities Citation Index and Current Contents/Arts & Humanities.

== Outstanding Dissertation Award in Music Education ==
The journal sponsors the Outstanding Dissertation Award in Music Education (ODA). Dissertations written by recent graduates of doctoral programs in music education are nominated by university faculty and reviewed by members of the journal's advisory committee and other reviewers selected by the editor. Based on their recommendations, the editor and a select panel of judges choose the winner. The winner is then announced in the print version. In the past, the ODA winner has been honored at a special session sponsored by the Council for Research in Music Education at The National Association for Music Education National Conference.
