= Basic Concepts in Music Education =

Basic Concepts in Music Education is a landmark work published in the USA 1958 as the Fifty-Seventh Yearbook of the National Society for the Study of Education. In 1954, the Music Educators National Conference (MENC) had formed its Commission on Basic Concepts in an attempt to seek a more soundly-based philosophical foundation. The work of the commission resulted in the publication of Basic Concepts, which advocated an aesthetic justification for music education. According to the aesthetic philosophy, music education should be justified for its own sake rather than for its extra-musical benefits.

== Contents ==
=== Section I: Disciplinary Backgrounds ===
- Therber H. Madison, The Need for New Concepts in Music Education
- Foster McMurray, Pragmatism in Music Education
- Harry S. Broudy, A Realistic Philosophy of Music Education
- John H. Mueller, Music and Education: A Sociological Approach
- George Frederick McKay, The Range of Musical Experience
- James Mursell, Growth Processes in Music Education
- Louis P. Thorpe, Learning Theory and Music Teaching
- Allen Britton, Music in Early American Public Education: A Historical Critique

=== Section II: Music in Schools ===
- C.A. Burnmeister, The Role of Music in General Education
- Robert House, Curriculum Construction in Music Education
- William C. Hartshorn, The Role of Listening
- E. Thayer Gaston, Functional Music
- Charles Leonhard, Evaluation in Music Education
- Oletta A. Benn, A Message for New Teachers

== Basic Concepts II ==
Richard Colwell edited Basic Concepts in Music Education II in 1991. This volume included updates from the living authors of the original volume as well as new contributions from leaders in the field.
