= Research in music education =

There are many published examples of research in music education, using a variety of approaches including surveys, experiments, and historical studies. In the United States, research in this field has been carried out for many years under the auspices of the National Association for Music Education (NAfME, formerly MENC). There are a number of books about music education research, and several journals are devoted to reports of research in this field.

== Types of research ==
In A Guide to Research in Music Education, Phelps, Ferrara and Goolsby define research as the identification and isolation of a problem into a workable plan; the implementation of that plan to collect the data needed; and the synthesis, interpretation and presentation of the collected information into some format which readily can be made available to others. Research typically falls into one of four categories: experimental, descriptive, historical, or philosophical.

=== Experimental ===
Experimental research is used to determine what will be or to establish a cause-and-effect relationship between variables. An example of experimental research is a 2000 study by Prickett and Bridges. The purpose of the study was to determine if the basic song repertoire of vocal/choral music education majors is significantly better than instrumental music education majors. The study revealed no significant difference between the two groups, and that neither group had developed a strong repertoire of standard songs outside of the college music classroom. The impact of the study was the recommendation that professors preparing music education students for their future careers consider adding activities to music education courses that build a strong song repertoire.

=== Descriptive ===
Descriptive research is used to determine what is and is usually conducted for one of three purposes:

1. to obtain data on the current status of existing phenomena, such as conditions, practices, and situations
2. to establish relationships among several variables, using the data about the current status to investigate relationships that may provide greater insight into the current status
3. to determine developments, trends, or changes by describing variables as they develop over a period of time

There are three broad categories of descriptive research: survey studies, relationship studies, and development studies.

==== Survey studies ====
A survey is a systematic method of collecting information on one or more variables. An example of a survey study is a 1998 study by Gillespie and Hamann. The purpose of the study was to gather descriptive information about orchestra programs that can be used as baseline data when considering the needs of school string programs. The findings indicated a continued enrollment increase in school orchestras in the 1990s although the number of orchestra teachers remained stable, and that larger schools are more likely to offer orchestra instruction. The impact of the study was the recommendation that school systems should provide larger, more adequate teaching facilities and that universities and string teachers should emphasize strategies for teaching larger string classes in their teacher preparation programs.

==== Development studies ====
Development studies collect information on existing situations, determine relationships, and examine changes in these variables over a period of time. Development studies include:

1. longitudinal studies, which are conducted over a period of time with data collected from the same sample at specific intervals during the study
2. trend studies, in which a population is sampled and subjects at the same level of development are tested
3. cohort studies, which measure an entire population at periodic intervals over a period of time

=== Historical ===
Historical research refers to the collection of data to record and interpret past events. Source materials used by the historical researcher are normally of two kinds, primary and secondary. A primary source is first-hand information, observed directly by the researcher. A secondary source is second-hand information, not original to the researcher. Through the process of external criticism, the researcher learns whether or not the object of scrutiny is authentic. Through the process of internal criticism, the researcher determines if the information contained in the object is credible. An example of historical research is a 1993 study by Gruhn. The purpose of the study was to determine if Lowell Mason's Manual of the Boston Academy of Music for the Instruction in the Elements of Vocal Music on the System of Pestalozzi is truly based on Pestalozzian principles. A detailed comparison of the Manual, a work by Pfeiffer and Nageli, and a work by Kubler revealed that the Pfeiffer and Nageli work is much closer to the ideas advocated by Pestalozzi than the Kubler work, and that Mason's Manual is little more than a translation of Kubler.

=== Philosophical ===
Philosophical research is used to examine the underlying principles in any field. An example of philosophical research is a 1999 article by Bennett Reimer published in The Music Educators Journal: "Facing the Risks of the Mozart Effect." This article is a response to the practice of music educators who advocated music education because of its relationship to spatial task performance. A 1993 research report from the Center for the Neurobiology of Learning and Memory, University of California, Irving by Rauscher, Shaw, and Ky is an example of the research literature that supported what became known as "the Mozart Effect." Reimer rejects spatial task performance as justification for music education because, according to Reimer's aesthetic philosophy, music education should be justified by its merit as an art, not for extra-musical reasons.

== History of research in American music education ==
In 1837 the Connecticut General Assembly voted to collect educational data. Questionnaires were sent to all Connecticut schools in 1838. Eight questions were about music instruction. This was probably the first attempt in the U.S. to collect data on music instruction on a wide-scale basis and perhaps the earliest example of research in music education.

In 1918 the Educational Council was established by the Music Supervisors National Conference (later the Music Educators National Conference or MENC). The Educational Council published bulletins, mostly based on survey data and including recommendations for the profession. One such bulletin was The Present Status of Music Instruction in Colleges and High Schools 1919-1920. In 1923 the name of the organization was changed from Educational Council to the National Research Council of Music Education. The name changed again in 1932 to the Music Education Research Council. The Journal of Research in Music Education began publication in 1953 under the editorship of Allen Britton. At first many of the articles were based on historical and descriptive research, but in the early 1960s the journal began to shift to experimental research. The Society for Research in Music Education was established in 1960, and in 1963 the Journal of Research in Music Education became its official publication. The MENC Historical Center was established in 1965. In 1978, MENC founded several Special Research Interest Groups.

== Research publications ==
Price and Chang (2000) provide an overview of the many diverse music education research journals including annotation and publication details for each source. While the Journal of Research in Music Education continues to be the dominant journal in the field, other journals include the Bulletin of the Council for Research in Music Education, The Missouri Journal of Research in Music Education, The Bulletin of Research, Contributions to Music Education, The Bulletin of Historical Research in Music Education, and Update: The Applications of Research in Music Education. Research on the impact of music education research journals includes investigations of initial citation speeds (Hancock, 2015), accumulated citations (Hamann & Lucas, 1998), and highly-cited authors and sources (Kratus, 1993; Hancock & Price, 2020).

== Music Education Research Organizations ==
Society for Research in Music Education. Founded in 1960, the National Association for Music Education (NAfME) Society for Research in Music Education™ (SRME) is composed of NAfME members who have interest in all aspects of research in music education. The purpose of SRME is to encourage, support, and promote research as a vehicle for improving all aspects of music education.

== Handbook of Research on Music Teaching and Learning ==
One of the dominant events in the field of music education research was the 1992 publication of the Handbook of Research on Music Teaching and Learning. Edited by Richard Colwell, the Handbook contains fifty-five chapters written by more than seventy scholars. Colwell edited a second volume in 2002, The New Handbook of Research on Music Teaching and Learning.

To see the shift of emphasis that has taken place in music education research in recent years, one need only compare the contents of the 1992 volume and the 2002 volume. The inclusion of sections on "Conceptual Framework" and "Evaluation" in the 1992 volume is evidence of emphasis on standards and a set body of knowledge. The absence of similar sections in the 2002 volume is evidence of a shift toward a pragmatic philosophical and a constructivist teaching theory. The inclusion of a section on "related arts" in the 2002 volume recalls the research of the late 1960s and 1970s.
