= MMEA =

MMEA is a common abbreviation and may refer to:

- Maryland Music Educators Association
- Minnesota Music Educators Association
- Malaysian Maritime Enforcement Agency
- The Multidimensional Measure of Emotional Abuse
