= Deep Thought =

Deep Thought or Deep Thinking may refer to:

- Deep Thought (Hitchhiker's Guide to the Galaxy), a fictional computer in The Hitchhiker's Guide to the Galaxy
- Deep Thought (chess computer), an IBM-produced chess computer, named after the Hitchhiker's Guide's Deep Thought
- Deep Thoughts (album), or The Thought Remains the Same, a 2000 compilation album by bands on Nitro Records
- Deep Thoughts (Lil Durk album), 2025 album
- Deep Thoughts by Jack Handey, a segment on Saturday Night Live consisting of one-liner jokes written and orated by Jack Handey
- Deep Thinking, a 2017 book by Garry Kasparov and Mig Greengard

== See also ==
- Deep Thinkers, an American hip-hop group
- Deep Think, a feature of the Google Gemini chatbot
