= Journal of Research in Music Education =

- Discipline: Music education
- Language: English
- Edited by: Steven J. Morrison (University of Washington)

Publication details
- History: 1953–presently
- Publisher: SAGE Publications (United States)
- Frequency: Quarterly
- Impact factor: 0.696 (2017)

Standard abbreviations
- ISO 4: J. Res. Music Educ.

Indexing
- ISSN: 0022-4294 (print); 1945-0095 (web)
- LCCN: 54043754
- JSTOR: 00224294
- OCLC no.: 473055145

Links
- Journal homepage; Online Access; Online Archive

The Journal of Research in Music Education was established in 1953 under the editorship of Allen Britton. At first many of the articles described historical and descriptive research, but in the early 1960s the journal began to shift toward experimental research. The Society for Research in Music Education was established in 1960 and the Journal of Research in Music Education became its official publication in 1963. The journal is currently published by SAGE Publications in association with the National Association for Music Education.

== Scope ==
The Journal of Research in Music Education publishes reports of original research related to music teaching and learning. The journal covers topics such as music pedagogy, history, and philosophy, and addresses vocal, instrumental, and general music at all levels, from early childhood through to adult.

== Abstracting and indexing ==
The Journal of Research in Music Education is abstracted and indexed in the following databases:

- Academic Complete
- Academic Premier
- Arts & Humanities Citation Index
- Educational Research Abstracts Online
- ERIC
- Wilson Education Index/Abstracts

== See also ==
- Research in Music Education
