= Helen Bonny =

American music therapist (1921–2010)

Helen Lindquist Bonny (1921 – May 25, 2010) was a music therapist who developed "Guided Imagery and Music" often referred to as "GIM". Music therapist Kenneth Bruscia uses the following definition to describe Guided Imagery and Music:

"(GIM) refers to all forms of music-imaging in an expanded state of consciousness, including not only the specific individual and group forms that Bonny developed, but also all variations and modifications in those forms created by her followers."

Helen Bonny studied with E. Thayer Gaston at the University of Kansas in the early 1960s, where she received her bachelor's degree in music education, with a major in music therapy. She continued on to receive a master's degree in music education with an emphasis in research. In 1973 she published a book, co-written with Louis Savary, entitled "Music and Your Mind: Listening with a New Consciousness". Her PhD thesis in 1975 described her new method, which she called "Guided Imagery and Music," and which outlined the development of the first music programs and first applications of the method.

Although Guided Imagery and Music draws from various schools of psychology, Helen Bonny has cited its main influences as the humanistic and the transpersonal psychology of Carl Rogers, and Abraham Maslow. Bonny was also profoundly influenced by the work of Carl Jung.

The Method of Guided Imagery and Music is now taught to therapists and practiced on every inhabited continent on the Earth.

Helen Bonny's grandson, Miles Bonny, is an active recording musician in Kansas City, Mo. Helen Bonny herself was a violinist.
