= DJ Day =

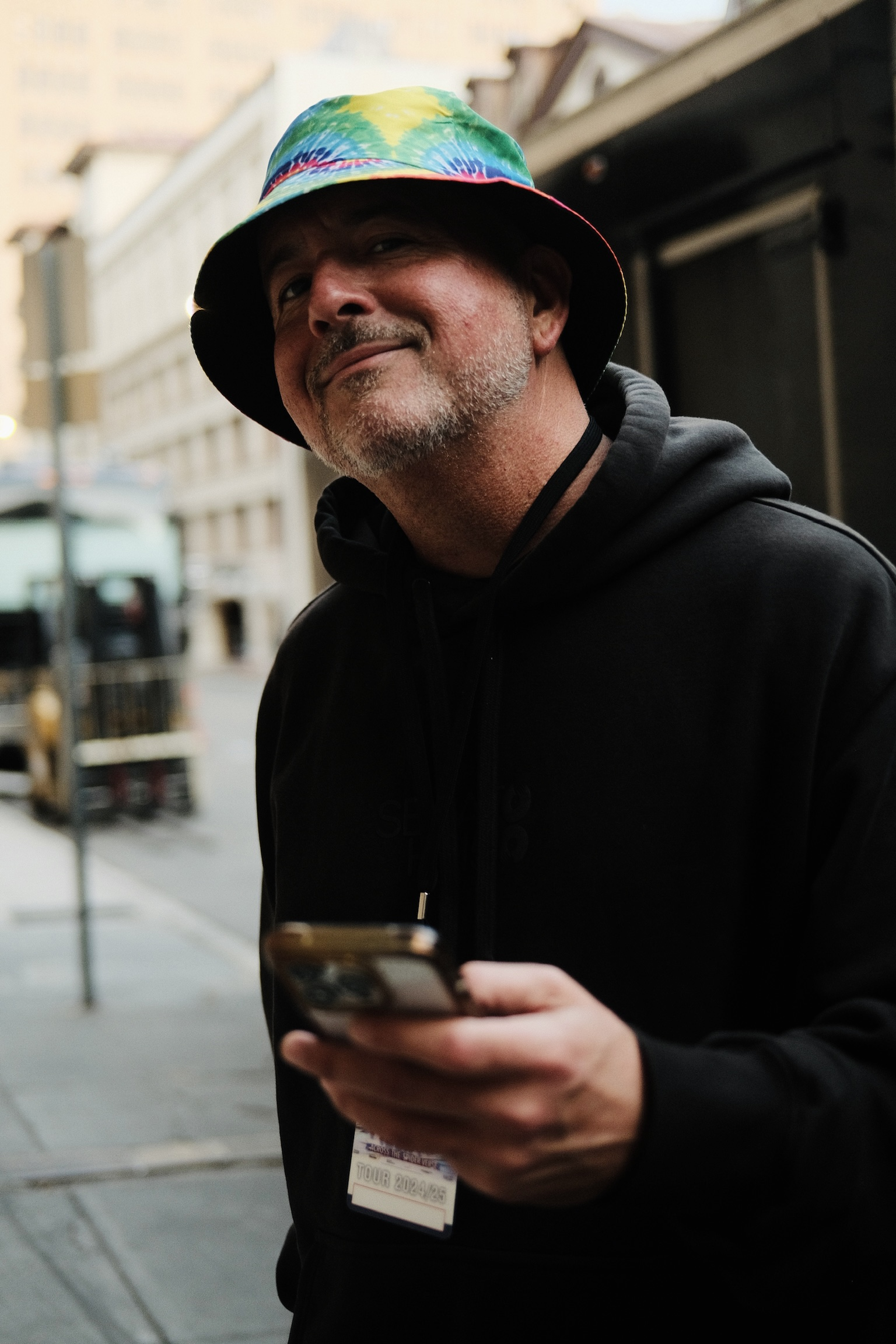
- DJ Day during the Across the Spider-Verse US Tour 2024

Background information
- Born: Damien Beebe
- Origin: Palm Springs, California, U.S.
- Genres: Hip hop, jazz, funk, soul, electronic
- Occupations: DJ, producer, multi-instrumentalist
- Instruments: Turntables, sampler, keyboard, drums, vocals
- Years active: 1995–present
- Labels: Piecelock 70, Melting Pot Music
- Website: Official website

DJ Day (born Damien Beebe) is an American DJ, producer, and multi-instrumentalist from Palm Springs, California. Known for blending elements of hip hop, jazz, funk, soul, and electronic music, his style incorporates sampling, turntablism, and live instrumentation.

== Early life and career ==
DJ Day began experimenting with music at age 13 using a homemade DJ setup built from hand-me-down equipment.

In 1995, he co-founded the Innernational Crew with DJ Rip One, a collective of DJs, MCs, b-boys, and graffiti artists. The group contributed to Southern California’s underground hip hop scene, performing at venues such as Radiotron and gaining recognition in publications like URB Magazine.

== Musical style and influences ==
DJ Day’s music is rooted in hip hop and incorporates elements of jazz fusion, Brazilian music, early electronic music, funk, and soul music. His work features both sample-based production and live instrumentation. He cites Herbie Hancock and DJ Jazzy Jeff as major influences.

== Career ==
DJ Day has toured extensively throughout North America, South America, Europe, Asia, and Oceania, performing in countries including Brazil, Germany, Russia, France, Japan, China, Australia, and New Zealand. He has shared stages with Amy Winehouse, Eminem, Cortex, and Marcos Valle.

In 2009, he toured the U.S. and Europe with producer Exile, using Akai MPC 2000XL drum machines live, including a performance at Dour Festival in Belgium.

From 2010 to 2016, he held a weekly DJ residency called Reunión at the Ace Hotel & Swim Club in Palm Springs.

In 2013, DJ Day was featured on Fuse TV's Crate Diggers, a series that delves into the vinyl collections of influential artists. During his appearance, he shared insights into his musical influences and the records that have shaped his career.

In 2024, DJ Day served as the scratch DJ for the Spider-Man: Across the Spider-Verse Live in Concert North American tour, performing alongside a full orchestra in 56 cities. The show received positive reviews for its integration of live DJing with orchestral scoring.

He has performed at events including The Do-Over and is a regular participant in DJ Jazzy Jeff’s Playlist Retreat.

== Discography ==
=== Studio albums ===
The Day Before (2007, Melting Pot Music) – Includes the track "Four Hills", featured in a DC Shoes campaign and nominated for "Track of the Year" on Gilles Peterson’s BBC Radio 1 show Worldwide.

Land of 1000 Chances is the second studio album by DJ Day, released on February 12, 2013, via Piecelock 70. The album fuses hip hop, soul, jazz, and electronic music, combining live instrumentation with traditional production techniques.

The album was produced by DJ Day and mastered by Chris Bellman at Bernie Grundman Mastering, known for his work on iconic albums such as Steely Dan’s Aja, Prince’s Purple Rain, and Michael Jackson’s Thriller. Executive production, tracking, and mixing were handled by Thes One of People Under the Stairs.

Session musicians featured on the album include keyboardist Kat Ouano (Crown City Rockers), guitarist Ken Belcher, and bassists Manny Quintero — who played on multiple tracks including the title track, “Adu,” and “Sushi in Fresno” — and Brenden Boerger, who played bass on “Daddy’s Home.”

The album was issued as a limited edition on LP, CD, and digital formats. The LP featured an animal-friendly leather casebound sleeve produced by Dorado Packaging, foil-stamped in gold, and included a removable Polaroid photograph. The cover photograph depicts Hana Chan, a Shiba Inu dog from the now-closed Bar Black Sheep in Shibuya, Tokyo. The photo was taken by Robin Rastenberger.

A limited translucent teal pressing of the LP was released exclusively for Ace Hotel's Coachella pop-up in 2013. The first 100 hand-numbered copies were hand-colored by Thes One, making these editions highly sought after by collectors.

Land of 1000 Chances received widespread critical acclaim. It debuted in the top 20 on iTunes’ Electronic/Downtempo charts in the U.S. and internationally, and was featured in KCRW’s Top 50 Most Played Albums for five consecutive weeks in early 2013.

Gilles Peterson supported the album with an interview and exclusive mix on his BBC Radio show.

Reviews from The Skinny, BBC Music, and Exclaim! praised the album’s production quality, emotive depth, and genre fusion.

Life After You (2022, 7T5 Music) – Reached the Top 10 on KCRW’s Top 30 Albums chart and received positive reviews for its atmospheric production.

=== Selected singles and EPs ===
- Day After Day series (2005–2006), Subcontact Records Japan
- Got to Get It Right EP (2007), Melting Pot Music
- Instant Saadiq (2009, with Miles Bonny), Melting Pot Music
- The Bottle (2010, with Yosaku), BSTRD Boots
- Land of 1000 Chances Remixes (2013), Serato Pressings
- Bohemian Idol / Land of 1000 Chances Remixes (2015), Bastard Jazz Recordings

DJ Day has also produced official remixes for artists including Quantic, People Under the Stairs, Incognito, Janko Nilovic, Alice Russell, and Aloe Blacc.

== Awards and recognition ==
- Legacy Award, Best of Coachella Valley (2016) – Presented by the Coachella Valley Independent for his contributions to the international and desert music scenes.

== Personal life ==
DJ Day resides in Palm Springs, California. He has cited the desert environment and local culture as influential to his music.
