= Alda Oliveira =

Brazilian composer and pedagogue (born 1945)

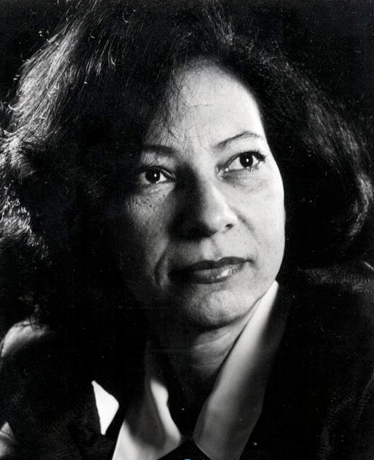
Portrait of Alda Oliveira

Alda de Jesús Oliveira (born March 14, 1945) is a Brazilian composer and pedagogue.

== Biography ==
Born on March 14, 1945, Salvador, Bahia, Brasil.

Oliveira received two BA degrees from the Federal University of Bahia, one in performance in 1968 and one in music education three years later. In 1979 she earned her MA from Tufts University, and in 1986 she received a Ph.D. in music education from the University of Texas at Austin.

She returned to the Federal University of Bahia to teach, in 1992 becoming the head of its school of music. She founded the Associação Brasileira de Educação Musical – ABEM (The Brazilian Association of Music Education) and served as its first president; she has also served on various educational boards and committees in Brazil.

Long active in the International Society for Music Education, she has written a number of pedagogical works on the subject of music. Oliveira's compositional output is mainly for small ensembles, and includes much music for educational purposes.
