= Disney Jazz Celebration =

Disney youth program

Disney Jazz Celebration, one of Disney's many youth programs supporting the performing arts, is a biannual jazz festival hosted at a Disney park. Starting in 2009, the festival originally took place in Walt Disney World Florida, but was moved to the Disneyland Park in California in 2011. The weekend long festival happens twice every year, once for instrumental ensembles and again for vocal ensembles.

The festival was never held in 2020.

== Itinerary ==
The weekend consists of many performances and seminars for all the attendees. The directors of the groups from all the schools each choose between competitive and non-competitive performance options. Regardless the student performers are encouraged to watch other schools and meet other students. In addition to the student performances there are many benefit performances by professional jazz artists. Students and their directors get full access to the parks and to seminars by professional musicians and nationally recognized musical adjudicators.

== Recognition ==
Disney's support of musical education through this festival has seen much positive press. Professional trumpeter Nathan Warner commended Disney for their "hospitality, organization, world-class delivery and passion for music education,". The National Association for Music Education officially endorses the festival.
