= North Carolina Music Educators Association =

The North Carolina Music Educators Association (NCMEA) is the state-level affiliate of National Association for Music Education (NAfME). The Association began as the North Carolina Contest Festival at the University of North Carolina at Greensboro and is, as of 2013, based in Raleigh, North Carolina. Every year, NCMEA hosts their annual conference in Winston-Salem.

== History ==
The history of music education associations in North Carolina can be divided into four segments:

- The evolution of the Contest-Festival, which began under the leadership of Wade R. Brown at the University of North Carolina at Greensboro in 1920
- The North Carolina State Music Teachers Association, an organization of African-American music educators established at North Carolina Central University and Hillside High School by the late Samuel Hill in 1931
- The North Carolina Music Educators Conference, which was established in 1947 under the presidency of Ezra Weiss, a faculty member at Guilford College
- The present-day North Carolina Music Educators Association, which was formed in 1970 from the NCSMTA and the NCMEC

From 1931 to 1970, African-American music educators were members of the North Carolina State Music Teacher's Association whose activities centered around North Carolina Central University. During the tenure of Association president Hortense Reid Kerr, the organization merged with the historically white North Carolina Music Educators Conference. James R. Hall, who had served with the North Carolina Department of Public Instruction, was president of the NCMEC at the time of the 1970 merger. Following the second year of his term, 1970-1971, Hortense Reid Kerr, who had served as the last president of the NCSMTA, served as the first president of the newly-formed NCMEA, 1971-1973.

== Publication ==
The official publication of the organization is the North Carolina Music Educator, which has been published since 1952.
