= Miles Bonny =

American singer (born 1980)

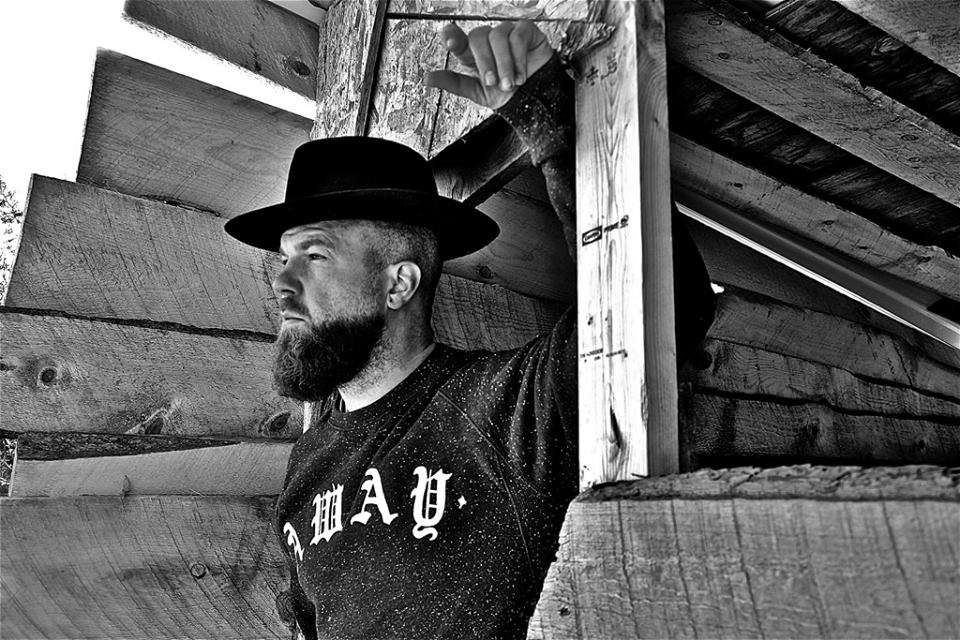

Background information
- Born: Miles Bonny; November 7, 1980 (age 45)
- Origin: Teaneck, New Jersey, United States
- Genres: Jazz, R&B, blues, hip hop, soul, neo soul
- Occupations: Record Producer, singer, trumpeter, DJ
- Years active: 2000–present
- Labels: INnatesounds, Melting Pot Music
- Website: www.milesbonny.com

Miles Bonny (born November 7, 1980) is a record producer, singer-songwriter, trumpeter, and DJ. Originally from New Jersey, Bonny began producing and creating hip hop while living in the midwest in the late 1990s, and founded the hip-hop group SoundsGood with rapper Joe Good in 2000. He has released a number of solo albums, and has collaborated with musicians such as Deep Thinkers, Ces Cru, and Sage Francis. He operates the record label InnateSounds, and in 2010 Bonny won the Pitch Music Award for DJ Hip-Hop in Kansas City. Currently based in New Mexico, Bonny frequently tours as a DJ and performer.

== Early life ==
Miles Bonny was born on November 7, 1980, in New York City, to his parents Anne Grothe and Francis Bonny, a broadway musician. His grandmother, Helen Bonny, was a music therapist. In 1981, Bonny moved to Teaneck, New Jersey where he attended Teaneck High School.

== Music career ==
=== Early years (1999–2004) ===
Bonny moved to Lawrence, Kansas, to attend the University of Kansas in 1999. There he began producing music and started the regional hip hop website Lawrencehiphop.com, which helped bring media attention to the region's hip hop artists. He has also worked on collaborative projects with Approach (Al Japro) and iD (The Find). During this period an internship with Sub Verse Music led Miles becoming more acquainted with the New York independent hip hop scene, which informed his ability to later start his own label, INnatesounds.

=== Soundsgood ===
Additionally, he co-founded the hip-hop group SoundsGood in 2000 with Kansas City-based rapper Joe Good. In the early years of SoundsGood the group was well known in the "house party" scene. After the pair released a 12-song eponymous debut LP in 2002, they released Biscuits & Gravy in 2005. Miles released an instrumental version of Biscuits & Gravy in 2007, after Joe Good had left the hip-hop scene. In 2008, Miles released another SoundsGood LP using material recorded between the band's debut and Biscuits.

=== Recent years (2005–present) ===
Miles moved to Kansas City, Missouri, in 2005. That year he produced the track "Comin For You" for rap artist Reach, which was chosen by a panel of judges including DJ Premier for Scion's NextUp competition. That same year he received international recognition in Scratch Magazine's Hydrosonic's section.

In 2006, Miles released his debut solo project, Smell Smoke? According to The Pitch, the main single from the album, "Miles Gets Open," is a "soulful, jazzy tune, on which Bonny himself plays trumpet, showcases his jazz upbringing in New Jersey, where his father, now a woodworker, used to work nights as a musician across the river in New York City."

In 2007 he produced and recorded for musicians such as Reggie B, Deep Thinkers, and John Brewer, all of whom are members of the hip-hop collective Innate Sounds. That year he also made the beat for "Call Me Francois" on Sage Francis' album Human the Death Dance, released on Epitaph Records.

He released the "Miles Gets Open" 7" & Closer Love EP in conjunction with the German-based Melting Pot Music in 2007. Miles' next work, Steveland, was released on December 15, 2007, and is a five-song album with Miles singing and playing the horns over a 2002 tribute to Stevie Wonder by indie producer Madlib.

In 2010, he won the Pitch Music Award for DJ Hip-Hop in Kansas City.

Bonny released Egg Black EP with producer B.Lewis on April 3, 2012, and he was nominated for a 2013 Amadeus Award (Austria) for his S3 project. He has performed internationally in countries such as Germany, the Czech Republic, Poland, Australia, New Zealand, and Austria.

In 2021 he released Lumberjack Soul 2. He is currently working on a duo album with wife Shhor in Taos, New Mexico.

== Personal life ==
In 2013 Bonny moved to Tres Piedras, New Mexico. His home is solar-paneled and handbuilt using materials such as wood, straw bales, and adobe. Bonny has a separate career as a social worker.

== Discography ==
=== Solo material ===
Studio albums

- 2000: Dino Jack Crispy
- 2003: The Find
- 2006: Smell Smoke
- 2007: Remixes Volume One
- 2007: Closer Love EP
- 2008: Clap Clap EP
- 2009: Steveland
- 2009: Scorpio Inn
- 2009: Lumberjack Soul / J.Birly / Breakfast
- 2010: INcense and Wine
- 2010: ACCAs
- 2011: Lumberjack Soul
- 2011: The "We" Remixes EP
- 2012: 2011 Bootlegs
- 2013: For My Real Folks EP
- 2013: Ain’t No Sunshine
- 2013: Super Yum Yums

Singles

- 2006: "Miles Gets Open "
- 2012: "Do You / You"
- 2013: "Water Rights"

=== SoundsGood ===
Studio albums

- 2002: SoundsGood
- 2005: Biscuits & Gravy
- 2006: Midnight Music (Subcontact)
- 2006: Midnight Music EP (Subcontact)

Singles

- 2004: "Money / Pacin" (InnateSounds)
- 2012: "Goodbye"

=== S3 ===
Studio albums

- 2012: Supa Soul Sh*t (Melting Pot Music)

=== Collaborations ===
Studio albums

- 2003: Al Japro by Approach and Miles Bonny
- 2009: Instant Saadiq by DJ Day and Miles Bonny
- 2010: Doin our Thang by Reggie B and Miles Bonny
- 2011: Did This For Hip Hop by Ces Cru and Miles Bonny
- 2011: It's been a LonG day by Lindquist & Greer
- 2012: Understanding by Jabee + Miles Bonny “
- 2012: Egg Black EP by Miles Bonny & B. Lewis
