= Gordon music learning theory =

Model for music education

Gordon music-learning theory is a model for music education based on Edwin Gordon's research on musical aptitude and achievement in the greater field of music learning theory. The theory is an explanation of music learning, based on audiation (see below) and students' individual musical differences. The theory takes into account the concepts of discrimination and inference learning in terms of tonal, rhythmic, and harmonic patterns.

== Audiation ==
"Audiation" is a term Gordon coined in 1975 to refer to comprehension and internal realization of music, or the sensation of an individual hearing or feeling sound when it is not physically present. Musicians previously used terms such as "aural perception" or "aural imagery" to describe this concept, though "aural imagery" would imply a notational component while audiation does not necessarily do so. Gordon suggests that "audiation is to music what thought is to language". His research is based on similarities between how individuals learn a language and how they learn to make and understand music. Gordon specifies that audiation potential is an element of music aptitude, arguing that to demonstrate music aptitude one must use audiation.

=== Audiation and language ===
Gordon says that audiation occurs when an individual is "listening to, recalling, performing, interpreting, creating, improvising, reading, or writing music". While listening to music, audiation is analogous to the simultaneous translation of languages, giving meaning to sound and music based on individual knowledge and experience.

Gordon emphasizes that music itself is not a language as it has no words or grammar, but rather has syntax, an "orderly arrangement of sounds, and context".

=== Types of audiation ===
Gordon differentiates varieties of audiation and categorizes them into 8 types and 6 stages.

- Type 1, listening to familiar or unfamiliar music
- Type 2, reading familiar or unfamiliar music
- Type 3, writing familiar or unfamiliar music from dictation
- Type 4, recalling and performing familiar music from memory
- Type 5, recalling and writing familiar music from memory
- Type 6, creating and improvising unfamiliar music while performing or in silence
- Type 7, creating and improvising unfamiliar music while reading
- Type 8, creating and improvising unfamiliar music while writing

=== Stages of audiation ===
In addition to outlining types of audiation, Gordon differentiates between stages of audiation.

- Stage 1, momentary retention
- Stage 2, imitating and audiating tonal patterns and rhythm patterns and recognizing and identifying a tonal center and macrobeats
- Stage 3, establishing objective or subjective tonality and meter
- Stage 4, retaining in audiation tonal patterns and rhythm patterns that have been organized
- Stage 5, recalling tonal patterns and rhythm patterns organized and audiated in other pieces of music
- Stage 6, anticipating and predicting tonal patterns and rhythm processes

== Learning sequences ==
To describe how students learn music, Gordon outlines two main categories of learning based on his research on audiation: discrimination learning and inference learning.

=== Discrimination learning ===
Discrimination learning is defined as the ability to determine whether two elements are same or not the same. Gordon describes five sequential levels of discrimination: aural/oral, verbal association, partial synthesis, symbolic association, and composite synthesis.

==== Aural/oral ====
Gordon describes that the most basic type of discrimination being aural/oral, where students hear tonal and rhythm patterns and imitate by singing, moving, and chanting patterns back to the instructor. Students listen in the aural portion of discrimination learning, while performing represents the oral portion. At this stage, students use neutral syllables to perform tonal and rhythm patterns.

==== Verbal association ====
After students are more able to audiate and perform basic rhythm and tonal patterns and become comfortable with imitating songs and chants in introduced tonalities and meters, Gordon explains the next step is verbal association, where contextual meaning is given to what the students are audiating and imitating through tonal or rhythm syllables (such as solfege or the names of concepts students may be audiating through tonal patterns such as tonic and dominant).

==== Partial synthesis ====
At both aural/oral and the verbal association level, students identify familiar tonal and rhythm patterns performed on neutral syllables by their verbal association.

==== Symbolic association ====
Symbolic association is the point at which students are introduced to notation, learning to associate written symbols and notation describing familiar tonal and rhythm patterns that had been introduced in the aural/oral and verbal association level of the skill learning sequence.

==== Composite synthesis ====
At the composite synthesis level, students give context to familiar tonal or rhythm patterns by reading and writing them and identifying their tonality or meter as introduced in the symbolic association stage.

=== Inference learning ===
At the inference learning level, students take an active role in their own education and learn to identify, create, and improvise unfamiliar patterns. Similar to discrimination learning, Gordon delineates separate categories of inference learning that students logically follow in the course of music learning: generalization, creativity/improvisation, and theoretical understanding.

==== Generalization ====
As aural/oral learning is the most basic element of discrimination learning, generalization is the basic element of inference learning. Generalization consists of aural/oral learning, verbal learning, symbolic reading, and writing. At the generalization level of learning, students may listen to sets of familiar and unfamiliar tonal or rhythmic patterns and determine whether the patterns are the same or different, ultimately reading familiar and unfamiliar patterns, as well.

==== Creativity/improvisation ====
The creativity/improvisation level of the above learning sequences has aural/oral and symbolic levels. At the aural/oral level, teachers present familiar or unfamiliar patterns and have students respond with patterns of their own, first on neutral syllables and later with the verbal association. At the symbolic level, students learn to recognize and sing patterns within written chord symbols, as well as learn to write their own responses to tonal patterns and rhythm patterns.

==== Theoretical understanding ====
The final level of inference learning is theoretical understanding, in which students gain further understanding of music theory concepts in aural/oral, verbal, and symbolic contexts. Students may learn concepts such as pitch letter-names, intervals, key-signature names, or concepts such as cadences and learn to recognize and perform patterns that apply such concepts.

==== Oral-Kinesic Etudé (noun) ====
Term coined by Kyra Gaunt in facilitating the learning ideals of black musical style.

1. a non-written form of communication or performance (may include oral or spoken expression as well as language of the body).
2. An everyday even like a hand-clapping game or street rhyme that is a medium through which black musical style is orally communicated or learned.
3. A mnemonic device that engenders a black way of Musicking

== Jump Right In ==
Jump Right In is an instrumental methods book with accompanying teacher editions that applies Gordon's music learning theory, co-written by Eastman School of Music music education faculty Richard F. Grunow and Christopher D Azzara alongside Gordon. The series of Winds and Percussion was first published in 1989–90, three years after the recorder edition. The collection also includes a strings methods edition. There is also a Jump Right In general music curriculum available for kindergarten through 4th grade, also published by GIA.

== Gordon music learning theory and music aptitude ==
Gordon's music learning theory is based on his research on music aptitude in line with cognitive theories regarding the organization of incoming stimuli. Gordon's research suggests that music aptitude is normally distributed in the general population similar to intellectual aptitude. His research also suggests that music aptitude that a child is born with can only be maintained with repeated positive exposure to musical experiences soon after (or even before) birth, up until approximately age 9 where a child reaches "stabilized" music aptitude.

The 1920s and 1930s heralded the creation of aptitude and achievement tests by Carl Seashore, E. Thayer Gaston, H.D. Wing, Arnold Bentley, and Edwin Gordon in an effort to identify students who were most likely to benefit from private instruction. Gordon created a number of tests to determine music aptitude for various age groups; he developed his first music aptitude test, the Musical Aptitude Profile, in 1965 for children in 4th to 12th grade. Later tests include Primary Measures of Music Audiation, published in 1979 for children ages 5 to 8, Intermediate Measures of Music Audiation for children ages 6 to 9, and Audie for children ages 3 to 4. Gordon describes that these tests of musical aptitude are meant to allow teachers to adapt their instruction to individual students' needs and to target students with high musical aptitude who may not otherwise be receiving advanced musical instruction.

== Criticism of the theory ==
Criticisms of music learning theory include Paul Woodford's concerns that the theory itself is a misnomer, and rather than a learning theory it is a "taxonomy of musical preconditions for critical thinking", and that "rather than overwhelming younger students in the beginning stages of instruction by focusing only on the complexities of music, teachers should use approaches such as Gordon's along with Kodaly, Orff, and other methodologies, to help students master basic musical skills and knowledge that are prerequisites to more independent kinds of thinking." Gordon responded to these claims, arguing that Woodford misunderstood elements of Gordon's methodology, erroneously associating Gordon with "clapping of rhythms", as well as misunderstanding the difference between chronological and musical age, the difference explaining why tonal and rhythm patterns should be taught independently in order to create a foundation for "complex cognition and independent musical thinking that relates to larger musical forms". Gordon also agrees with Woodford's comment that Gordon's approach should be taught alongside other methodologies, also asserting that he agrees with Woodford's suggestion that "students should be introduced to the full range of real-life kinds of musical thinking including less conventional, and even atypical, musical practices."

Similar criticisms include accusations that Gordon's skills-based programs of applying Music Learning Theory are "probably too narrow and limited in scope to provide students access to the diversity of musical belief systems, practices, and groups that exist", a concern of writer Paul G. Woodford and music education theorist Bennett Reimer. Woodford credits Gordon for his highly developed system about the nature of music teaching and learning, but cautions that Gordon's system is too prescriptive and proscriptive to students and teachers, and that music educators should also be aware of the diversity of practices and strive to not exert pressure on students to conform to conventional musical thought and behavior. Gordon's 1997 response responds to this indirectly, arguing that his methodology leaves room for other methodologies to be taught alongside it.
