= Dimitrije Bužarovski =

Macedonian composer, pianist and music scholar

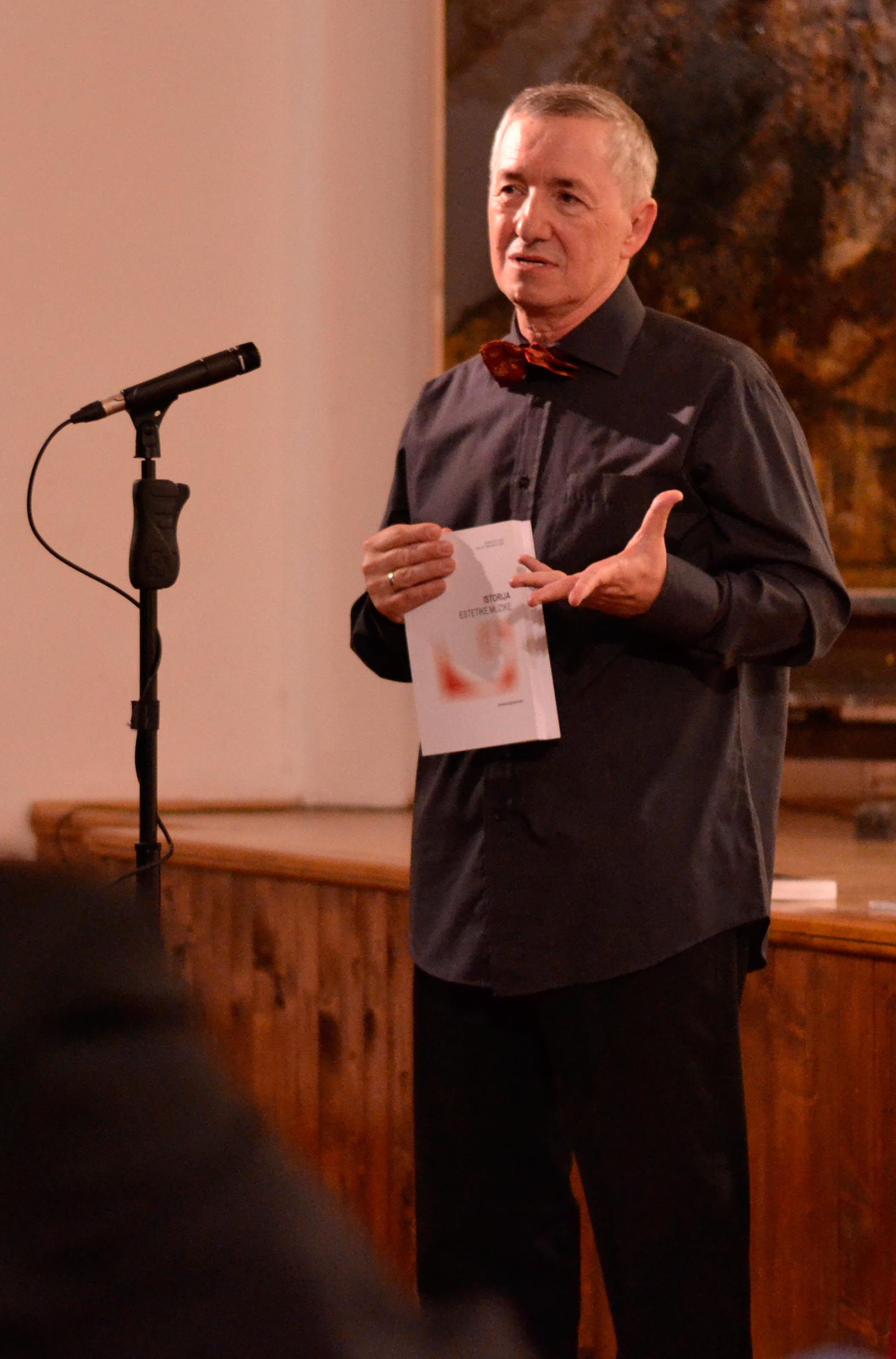
- Born: 8 August 1952 (age 74); Skopje, PR Macedonia, FPR Yugoslavia
- Education: Ss. Cyril and Methodius University of Skopje; University of Arts in Belgrade
- Known for: Buzarovski Archive - BuzAr; Radomir's Psalms op.47 Vocal Symphony op. 53; Nocturnes op. 49 & op. 52; All That Dance op. 39; Double concerto for violin and piano op. 61; History of Aesthetics of Music; Research Methodologies; Musiconomy; Sonology; Sociology of Music
- Scientific career
- Fields: Musical Composition, Musicology, Performance, Teaching
- Workplaces: Ss. Cyril and Methodius University of Skopje; University of Niš
- Website: buzar.mk

Dimitrije Bužarovski Ph.D. (Macedonian: Димитрије Бужаровски) (born 8 August 1952 in Skopje, SFR Yugoslavia) is a Macedonian composer, versatile artist and a scholar with interests in different fields: composition, musicology, computer and electronic music, performance, teaching and research.

== Works ==
His opus includes four symphonies and an overture, two operas, three oratorios, two ballets, nine piano, synthesizer and other instrument concertos; nine sonatas for piano and other instruments, a cycle of 13 nocturnes for piano, a cycle of five suites for two pianos, five vocal cycles, chamber and other works for solo instruments. In addition, he has written more than 30 scores for movies, television shows, theatrical productions etc. His pieces have been performed, recorded, and broadcast in Europe (Russia, France, Great Britain, Germany, the Netherlands, Spain, Greece, Bulgaria, Serbia, Poland) and the United States. His oratorio “Radomir’s Psalms” was nominated for the 2003 Grawemeyer Award (Music Composition) by Louisiana Tech University.

== Performances ==
As a performer, Dimitrije Buzarovski has given numerous piano and synthesizer recitals and other concerts in Europe (UK, Russia, the Netherlands and so on) and the US. He also conducts his orchestral works (operas: Candy Tale, Despina and Mister Dox, the oratorio Radomir's Psalms and the cantata Longing for the South).

== Writings ==
Dr. Buzarovski has published and edited numerous articles and books, which include: History of Aesthetics of Music, Introduction Into the Analysis of Musical Piece, English-Macedonian Glossary of Sound Technical Terms, Basics of Sound Digital Archiving, Research Methodologies Applied to Musicology, Musiconomy, Sonology, Sociology of Music etc.

== Teaching ==
Since 1984 he has been a professor at the Faculty of Music of Ss. Cyril and Methodius University of Skopje, where he teaches Aesthetics and Sociology of Music, Polyphony and Harmony, Analysis of Musical Forms, Introduction into Arts Business, Sonology and Multimedia, and Electronic Music. In addition, he has been teaching at the University of Niš Faculty of Arts (Vocal literature, Music Styles, Research Methodologies, Arts Business, Aesthetics of Music, Composition and Digital Sound Processing) since 2007. Honorary Doctorate of University of Niš has been awarded to Prof. Dr. Dimitrije Buzarovski on 18 November 2014.

He has also coordinated three TEMPUS projects and a SCOPES project, project in Business Management of the State Department of the US and Study Abroad project with Arizona State University. In 2001, Dr. Buzarovski established the Sonology and Multimedia program at UKIM Faculty of Music. It is aimed at undergraduate, graduate and doctoral students. He has supervised more than 40 PhD and MAs to completion over the last 16 years.

== Digital archiving ==
In September 2000, he established the Institute for Research and Archiving of Music - IRAM which was the leading international institution for the archiving of Balkan cultural heritage. IRAM is the founder of the Student Internet Radio (existing since 2003) and an organizer of 16 international conferences taking place in Macedonia, UK, the Netherlands and Switzerland (Contemporary trends in musicology and ethnomusicology, Reflections on Macedonian Music, Cultural Policy and Music Education etc.).

On 15 October 2012 Dr. Buzarovski established the Buzarovski Archive - BuzAr, a digital collection of video, audio, photos, books, papers, scores and other artifacts related to Balkan Cultures and Traditions. The collection is based on Dimitrije Buzarovski's musical scores, performances, video and audio recordings, digitising of cultural heritage, and musicological and ethnomusicological works. A movie from the retrospective concert titled "From Opus 1 to Opus 62" of composer Dimitrije Buzarovski is the first video streaming from the BuzAr web site.

== List of works ==
=== Solo instruments ===
1. Sonatine for piano op. 1 (1973)
2. Sonata for piano no.1 op. 2 (1976)
3. II Sonata for piano op. 17 (1983)
4. III Sonata for piano op. 25 (1987)
5. Variations on a folk theme for solo clarinet op. 10 (1978)
6. Motifs for solo cello (1979)
7. "Parahodot" Variations for solo cello op. 44 (1997)
8. 9 Nocturnes (Vecherinki) for piano op. 49 (2000)
9. 4 Nocturnes (Vecherinki) for piano op. 52 (2004)
10. Etude for violin solo op. 59 (2010)

=== Song cycles ===
1. "Humorous songs" for baritone and piano op. 5 (1976)
2. "Love songs" for baritone and piano op. 8 (1979)
3. "Songs about Goce" for baritone and wind quintet op. 40 (1977) (also versions for piano or synthesizer op. 40b 1984 & for baritone and oboe, clarinet, folk instruments, percussion and synthesizer op. 40c 1996)
4. "Heroic songs" for baritone and string orchestra op. 16 (1983)
5. "Elegy about you" for soprano, baritone and synthesizers op.26 (1984)
6. "Trois poemes de Paul Verlaine composes à la maniere d'impressionnistes" for baritone and piano op. 30 (1989)
7. "Spiritual songs" for children's choir, soprano, baritone and synthesizers op. 36 (1992)
8. "Songs of Peace and War" for soprano, mezzo-soprano and synthesizers op. 38 (1994)
9. Eco songs op. 41 (1996)
10. "Wedding songs" for children's choir and synthesizers op. 45 (1997)

=== Chamber music ===
1. Chorale, prelude and fugue for oboe, clarinet and bassoon op. 11 (1980)
2. String quartet op. 3 (1971)
3. Folk suite for four trombones op. 14 (1982)
4. Wind quintet op. 15 (1981)
5. Folk quintet for wind instruments op. 23 (1985)
6. "Elegy" for chamber orchestra op. 6 (1975)
7. Five preludes for synthesizer and chamber orchestra (1987)
8. A suite from music for the plays "Zoika's flat" and "Deutsche Mark" for violin, viola and piano op. 31 (1989 - alto saxophone version op. 31b 1994)
9. Sextet for wind quintet and synthesizer op. 32 (1990)
10. All that Dance (Variation for two pianos) op. 39 (1995)
11. TechnoSymph op. 42 (1997)
12. Kreuzweg - Reflexionen IX for flute, viola, guitar and accordion op. 50 (2001)
13. 4 Nocturnes (Vecherinki) for 2 pianos op. 52 (2009)
14. Fantasia for cello (viola) & piano op. 55 (2009)
15. Jazz Sonata for alto saxophone, piano and double bass op. 56 (2009)
16. "Mane" Sonata for violin and piano op. 57 (2009)
17. Cabaret for violin, cello and piano four-hands op. 62a (2012), accordion trio version op. 62b (2012)
18. Trio Sonata op. 63 (2013)
19. Sonata Concertata for violin and piano op. 58e (2014)
20. A Challenge for violin and piano op. 64 (2014)
21. A Challenge for violin, English horn and piano op. 64a (2015)

=== Concertos ===
1. Musurgia ecclectica for symphony orchestra and synthesizer op. 29 (1989)
2. Concerto for string orchestra, harp and synthesizer op. 33 (1990)
3. Piano Concerto (for piano, 4 soloists and symphony orchestra) op. 46 (1998)
4. Baroque concertino for string orchestra and synthesizer op.27 (1988, Trio version op. 27b 2001)
5. Concerto grosso for violin, cello, piano, string orchestra and percussions op. 48 (1999, Trio version 2001)
6. Nonet Concerto op. 51 (2003)
7. Concerto for trumpet and string orchestra op. 58 (2010)
8. Double concerto for violin and piano op. 61 (2012)
9. Glitch Rhapsody for violin, oboe/English horn, piano and strings op. 65а (2015)

=== Symphonies/Ouvertures ===
1. Fantasia quasi una Sinfonia op. 4 (1973) (I Symphony)
2. II Symphony op. 9 (1979)
3. TechnoSymph op. 42 (1997) (III Symphony)
4. Vocal Symphony (for 8 voices and symphony orchestra) op. 53 (2005) (IV Symphony)
5. Ouverture op. 54 (2007)

=== Oratorios and cantatas ===
1. "Ballad" for tenor, choir and chamber orchestra (1981)
2. "Four heroic songs for wind orchestra mezzo-soprano, baritone and choir" (1978)
3. "Eyes" a cantata for soprano, baritone, narrator and wind orchestra (1980)
4. "Live-memory" oratorio for soprano, baritone, choir, narrators and synthesizers op. 22 (1985)
5. "Ohrid" oratorio for soprano, alto, tenor, baritone, narrator, choir and symphonic orchestra op. 28 (1988)
6. "Radomir's Psalms" oratorio for 2 sopranos, tenor, bass, children's choir, choir and symphonic orchestra op. 47 (1999)
7. "T'ga za jug" ("Longing for the South") for tenor, chamber choir and orchestra op. 60 (2011)

=== Ballets ===
1. "Trains" ballet op. 21 (1986)
2. "Snow-white" children's ballet op. 24 (1986)
3. "The Skeleton and the Beauty" op. 37 (1993)

=== Operas ===
1. "Candy tale" children's opera op. 7 (1976)
2. "Despina and Mister Dox" comic opera op. 35 (1991)

=== Electronic music ===
1. Experiment I (also a version for synthesizer and chamber orchestra) op. 11 (1984)
2. Tema con repetizioni op. 19 (1984)
3. Pop-suite op. 20 (1984)
4. "Eneads I" (1987), "Eneads II" (1991), "Eneads III" (1991) op. 34
5. "The Skeleton and the Beauty" op. 37 (1993)
6. SynthSon op. 43 (1997)

=== Incidental music ===
"Zoika's flat" (1986), "Deutsche Mark" (1987), "Good night, mother" (1987), "Fairy tale about time" (1988), "Collecting center" (1988), "Weekend of corpses" (1989), "Giant" (1989), "Nothing without Trifolio" (1990), "Monsters in our city" (1990) (also a TV serial), "The comedy of errors" (1990), "Hunter’s tales" (1990),"A tavern on the road to Europe" (1991), "Electra" (1992), "Clowns" (1993), "Caligula" (1994), "Hecuba" (1994), "Confusions" (1994), "Dicho Zograf" (1994)," Harlequin" (1995)," Prometheus" (1995) "Waiting for the spirit" (1995), "Fortinbras is dead " (1996), " Farewall" (1997), "Two in Eden" (1998), "Figaro's wedding" (1998), "Jane Zadrogaz"(2001), "Ghoul Quest" (2001) "Completed works by Shakespeare" (2002), "Advertisements for old clowns" (2002), "Midsummer Night's Dream" (2008)

== Books ==
- History of Aesthetics of Music, UKIM Faculty of Music, Skopje, 1989; University of Niš, Faculty of Fine Arts, 2013; Historia e estetikës së muzikës, Logos-A, 2014.
- Introduction into the Analysis of Musical Piece, UKIM Faculty of Music, Skopje, 1996.
- From natural to computer sounds (selected and edited by Dimitrije Buzarovski), UKIM Faculty of Music, Skopje, 2000.
- English-Macedonian dictionary of Sound Processing Technical Terms, UKIM Faculty of Music, Skopje, 2001.
- Basics of Sound Digital Archiving, IRAM, Skopje, 2002.
- Reflections on Macedonian Music – Past and Future, I London Conference IRAM, Skopje, 2001 (author & editor).
- Contemporary trends in musicology and ethnomusicology, IRAM, Skopje, 2002 (author & editor).
- Reflections on Macedonian Music – Past and Future, II London Conference IRAM, Skopje, 2003 (author & editor).
- Contemporary trends in musicology and ethnomusicology, II Struga Conference, IRAM, 2003 (author & editor).
- Cultural policy and music education I Skopje Conference, IRAM, 2004 (author & editor).
- Reflections on Macedonian Music – Past and Future, III London Conference IRAM, Skopje, 2004 (author & editor).
- Contemporary trends in musicology and ethnomusicology, III Struga Conference, IRAM, 2004 (author & editor).
- Cultural policy and music education II Skopje Conference, IRAM, 2005 (author & editor).
- Reflections on Macedonian Music – Past and Future, IV London Conference IRAM, Skopje, 2005 (author & editor).
- Contemporary trends in musicology and ethnomusicology, X IRAM Conference, IRAM, 2005 (author & editor) (only electronic version).
- Cultural policy and music education" XI IRAM Conference, IRAM, 2006 (author & editor) (only electronic version).
- Reflections on Macedonian Music – Past and Future, XII IRAM Conference IRAM, Skopje, 2006 (author & editor) (only electronic version).
- Cultural policy and music education" XIII IRAM Conference, IRAM, 2006 (author & editor) (only electronic version).
- Research Methodologies Applied to Musicology, DOO „Nota”, Knjaževac, 2012.
- Musiconomy – Intro into Music Management, Economy and Marketing, Faculty of Fine Arts of the University of Niš and Research Center of SASA and the University of Niš, 2014.
- Sonology, Faculty of Fine Arts of the University of Niš and Research Center of SASA and the University of Niš, 2015.
- Sociology of Music, Faculty of Fine Arts of the University of Niš, 2016.

== Selected papers ==
- "Generative Ideas in the Aesthetics of Music." International Review of the Aesthetics and Sociology of Music, 17/2 (1986): 163–84.
- with J. Humphreys and B. Wells: "College Students Attitudes Toward Music." PMEA Bulletin of Research in Music Education, Fall (1995/1996): 20–42.
- "Firfov Collection Revisited: the Oral Tradition after 30 Years." In IV IRAM Conference Contemporary Trends in Musicology and Ethnomusicology, 41–52. Skopje, 2003.
- "IRAM’s CD Female vocal soloists from the Firfov Collection." In Third Struga Conference Contemporary Trends in Musicology and Ethnomusicology, 1–13. Skopje, 2004.
- Digital Extension of Music Memory – Music as a Collective Cultural Memory. Kultura/Culture 4, (2013). Skopje: Mi-An: 123–29.
