= Bennett Reimer =

American music educator (1932–2013)

- Born: June 19, 1932; New York City
- Died: November 18, 2013 (aged 81); Wilmette, Illinois
- Awards: Honorary Doctorate DePaul University 1997; "Legend of Teaching" Northwestern University School of Music 1997

Academic background
- Education: State University of New York at Fredonia (B.S 1954); University of Illinois at Urbana–Champaign (M.S. 1955); University of Illinois at Urbana–Champaign (Ed.D. 1963)

Academic work
- Era: 1955–1997
- Main interests: Music education
- Notable works: A Philosophy of Music Education

Bennett Reimer (June 19, 1932 – November 18, 2013) was an American music educator. He held the John W. Beattie Endowed Chair in Music at Northwestern University from 1978 until retirement in 1997, where he was chair of the Music Education Department, director of the Ph.D. program in Music Education, and founder and director of the Center for the Study of Education and the Musical Experience, a research group of Ph.D. students and faculty. A native of New York City, where he was born in 1932, he was on the faculties of Case Western Reserve University, Cleveland, Ohio (1965–1978) where he held the Kulas Endowed Chair in Music and was chair of the Music Education Department; the University of Illinois at Urbana-Champaign (1960–1965); Madison College, Harrisonburg, Virginia (1958–1960); and the Richmond Professional Institute of the College of William and Mary, (1955–1957). He held the bachelor's degree in music education from the State University of New York at Fredonia, and master's and doctorate degrees in music education from the University of Illinois, where he worked with Charles Leonhard and Harry Broudy. He began his career in music as a clarinetist and then oboist. Reimer then became a specialist in the philosophy of music education, curriculum development, theory of research, and comprehensive arts education programs.

== Publications ==
Reimer’s book A Philosophy of Music Education, first published in 1970, a second edition in 1989, and a third edition, A Philosophy of Music Education: Advancing the Vision, in 2003, (Prentice Hall) has been translated into French, Japanese, and Chinese, with a Greek edition in preparation. He was the author and editor of some two dozen other books and has written over 145 articles and chapters on a variety of topics in music and arts education. Reimer’s textbooks on music for grades one through eight, Silver Burdett Music, were the most widely used throughout the United States and the world for two decades.

== Professional contributions ==
As a participant in the professional life of his field, Reimer served on the editorial boards of all the major journals; was National Chairman of the National Association for Music Education (MENC) Committee on Aesthetic Education; was MENC liaison for Arts Education Initiatives: represented MENC as a member of the Alliance for Curriculum Reform and the Aesthetic Education Curriculum Program sponsored by the U.S. Office of Education; was a member of the six-person task force that wrote the National Standards for Music Education; and was one of six Commission Authors of position papers for the MENC Vision 2020 Project (the Housewright Symposium/Vision 2020). He was Director of a three-year research project on the general music curriculum sponsored by the U.S. Office of Education; was a research exchange scholar studying music education practices from Kindergarten through Conservatory in China for a three-month period in 1986, sponsored by the Chinese government and Harvard Project Zero; was for six years Co-Director and Principal Consultant for the teacher education project “Education for Aesthetic Awareness: The Cleveland Area Project for the Arts in the Schools”; and for five years was a member of the Rockefeller Brothers Fund Awards Committee for Exemplary School Arts Programs. Reimer presented many keynote addresses and lectures each year throughout the United States and the world, including appearances in England, Japan, Saudi Arabia, New Zealand, the Netherlands, Canada, Hong Kong, Ireland, South Africa, China, and Australia. He was awarded an Honorary Doctorate from DePaul University, Chicago, in 1997. Also in 1997 he was designated the third “Legend of Teaching” in the history of the Northwestern University School of Music. A special double issue of The Journal of Aesthetic Education, "Musings: Essays in Honor of Bennett Reimer," was published in Winter 2000. In 2002, Reimer was inducted into the Music Educators Hall of Fame. In 2008 he was the recipient of the MENC Senior Researcher Award.

== Death ==
Reimer died in Wilmette, Illinois on November 18, 2013, aged 81.

== Education record ==
State University of New York, College at Fredonia. B.S. 1954. University of Illinois at Urbana-Champaign. M.S. 1955. University of Illinois at Urbana-Champaign. Ed.D. 1963.

== Educational employment ==
1955–1957 Richmond Professional Institute of the College of William and Mary, Richmond, VA. Instructor. Band Director; woodwinds; theory; conducting; music appreciation.

1958–1960 Madison College, Harrisonburg, VA. Assistant Professor. Wind Ensembles; woodwinds; theory; conducting; music appreciation. Director of Music, Campus Laboratory School.

1960–1965 University of Illinois at Urbana-Champaign. Instructor, Assistant Professor. Foundations of Music Education. Music and College Placement Consultant, University of Illinois Educational Placement Office.

1965–1978 Case Western Reserve University, Cleveland, OH. Kulas Professor of Music, 1971–78; Director of Music Education.

1978–1997 Northwestern University, Evanston, IL. John W. Beattie Professor of Music; Chairman of Music Education; Founder and Director, Center for the Study of Education and the Musical Experience.

== Viewpoint ==
Reimer's viewpoint was that only "good music" (music evoking a feeling) should be taught. Teachers will have a firm pedagogical base and sensitivity, all will learn music because it helps us develop self-knowledge.
