= International Journal of Music Education =

- Discipline: Music education
- Language: English
- Edited by: S. Alex. Ruthmann, Francisco Javier Zarza Alzugaray, Gwen Moore

Publication details
- History: 1983-present
- Publisher: SAGE Publications
- Frequency: Quarterly

Standard abbreviations
- ISO 4: Int. J. Music Educ.

Indexing
- ISSN: 0255-7614 (print); 1744-795X (web)
- LCCN: 85645468
- OCLC no.: 476468626

Links
- Journal homepage; Online access; Online archive

The International Journal of Music Education is a quarterly peer-reviewed academic journal covering the field of music education. The editors-in-chief are S. Alex Ruthmann (New York University), Francisco Javier Zarza Alzugaray (University of Zaragoza), and Gwen Moore (Mary Immaculate College). It was established in 1983 and is currently published by SAGE Publications on behalf of the International Society for Music Education.

== Abstracting and indexing ==
International Journal of Music Education is abstracted and indexed in:

- Academic Search Premier
- Arts & Humanities Citation Index
- British Education Index
- Current Contents/Arts & Humanities
- Current Contents/Social and Behavioral Sciences
- Educational Research Abstracts Online
- ERIC
- Scopus
- Social Sciences Citation Index
