= Allen Britton =

American music educator (1914–2003)

Allen Perdue Britton (May 25, 1914 – February 17, 2003) was an American music educator.

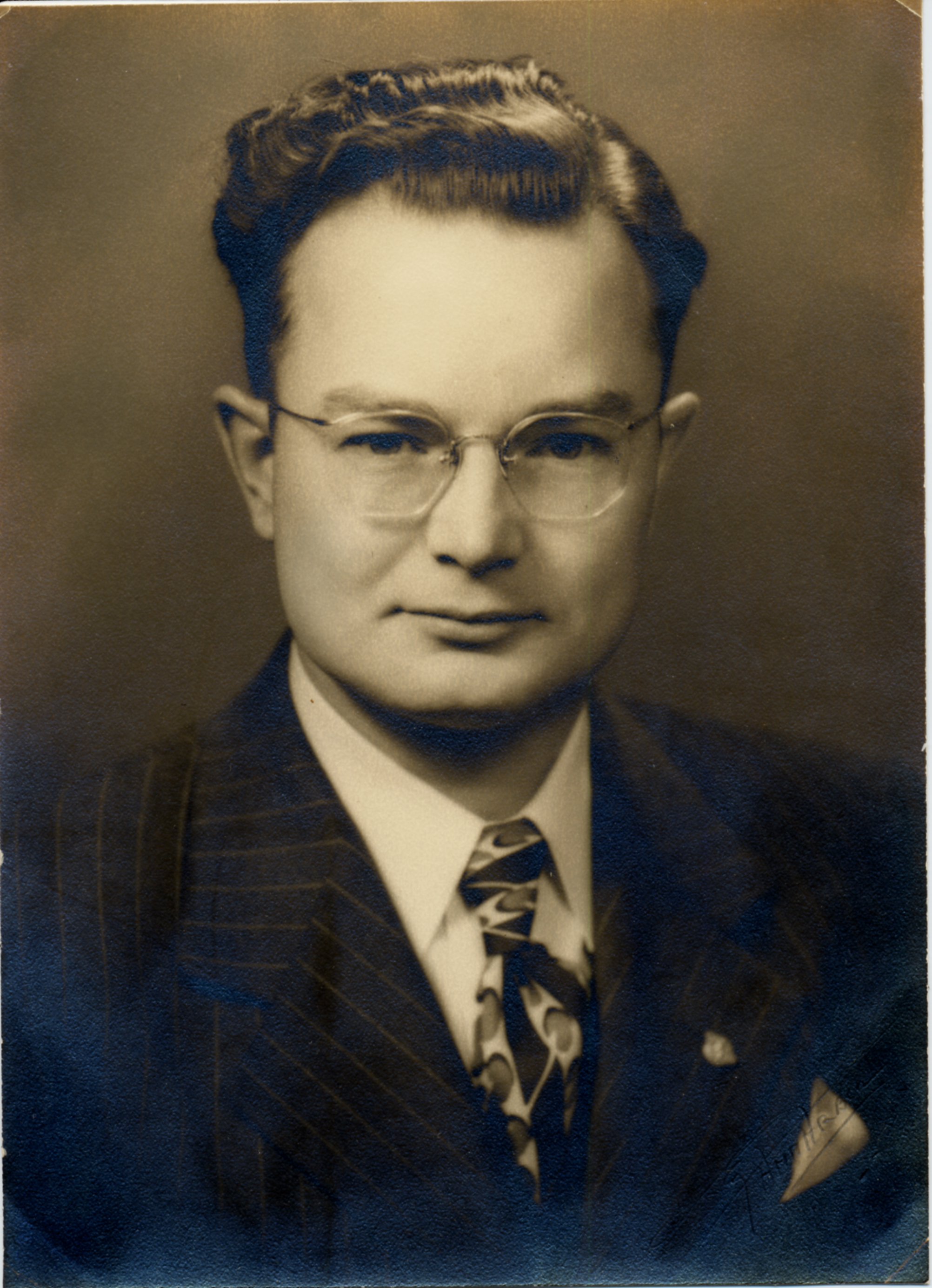
Allen Perdue Britton about 1934

Through his many passions in life he contributed to elevating the field of music education to the same stature as the field of musicology. He developed the doctoral program in music education at the University of Michigan, where he directed 51 dissertations. He contributed heavily to the history of music pedagogy in early America, especially singing schools. To combine his two interests of music education and history he joined with Marguerite V. Hood, Warren S. Freeman, and Theodore F. Normann and created the Journal of Research in Music Education (JRME).

Less than a decade after developing the journal for Music Educators National Conference (MENC), he became its president from 1960 to 1962. It was during this time that Russia had launched Sputnik and the United States tried to counteract that advancement by going "Back to the Basics." This meant that there was little monetary support for music. As the president of the Music Educators National Conference, he took it upon himself to harness the full potential of this organization's political power. MENC, now the National Association for Music Education, has since exercised its influence over numerous political and social actions.

== Early life ==
Britton was born on May 25, 1914, on a farm just west of Elgin, Kane County, Illinois. He was the oldest son of Walter Allen and Mary (Perdue) Britton. The family lived on a farm for Allen's first six years, then moved into Elgin where his father started his business Britton Dairy. Allen married his high school sweetheart Veronica Fern Wallace on August 30, 1938, in Elgin, Illinois.

== Education ==
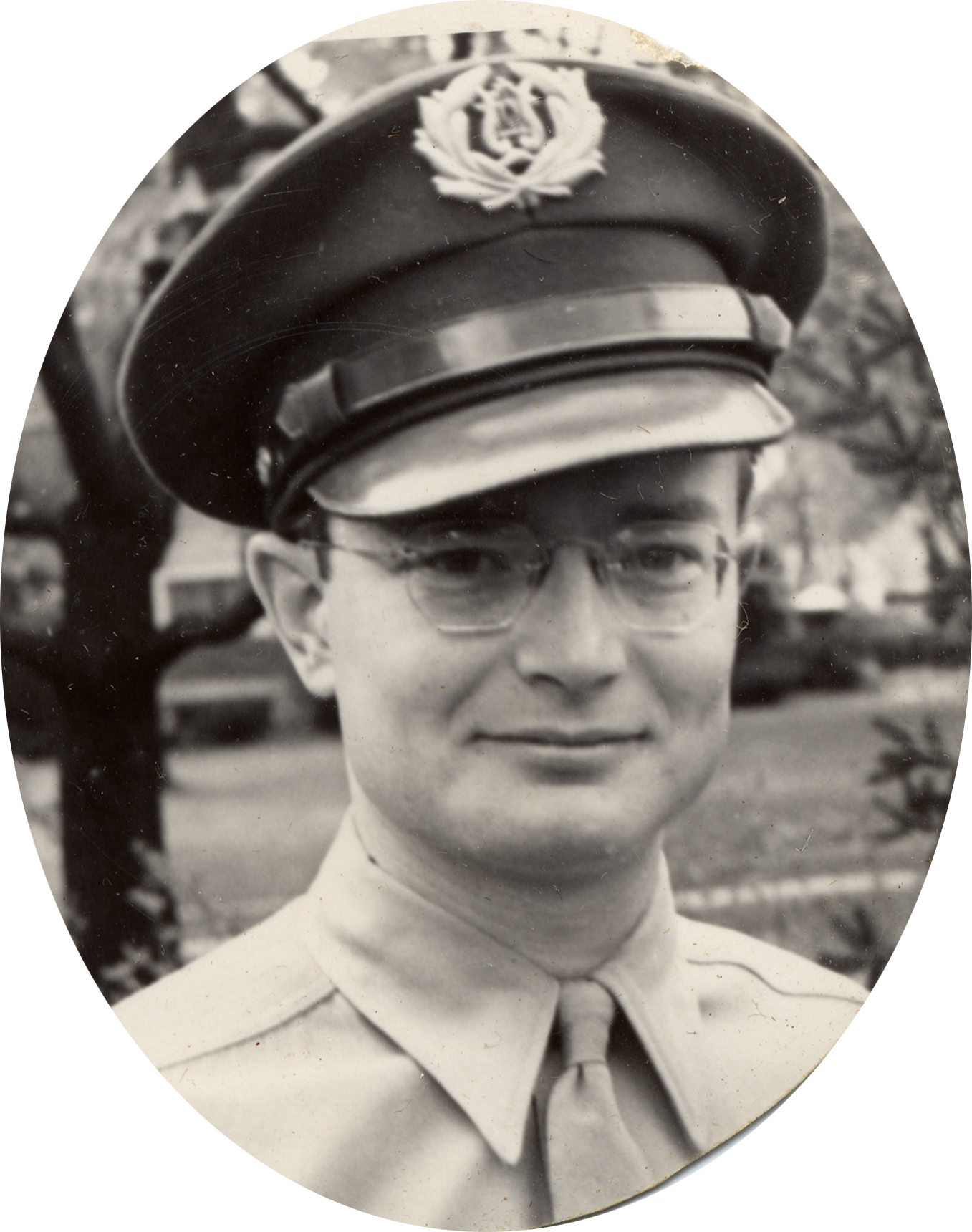
Allen Perdue Britton during World War II

Britton obtained his high school diploma from Elgin High School, Illinois in 1932. He then attended the University of Illinois, from which he graduated with a BSc in Instrumental Music in 1937, and a MA in English and Education in 1939. In 1949, he completed his PhD in Musicology at the University of Michigan, his thesis titled Theoretical Introductions in American Tune-Books to 1800.

== Work experience ==
Britton taught band and English in the public schools of Griffith, Indiana and also at Eastern Illinois University. He served in the US Army during the Second World War as a military policeman and a band member. Britton had learned German from his German-born grandmother.

Britton served as assistant professor of music at the University of Michigan from 1950, full professor in 1959, assistant dean in 1960, and as dean of the School of Music from 1971 to 1979. He was also a trustee of the National Music Camp at Interlochen.

== Publications ==
Britton was founding editor of Journal of Research in Music Education (JRME), at which he worked from 1953 to 1972. He was also the editor of the textbook series Foundations of Music Education and the founding editor of American Music.

Britton wrote American Sacred Music Imprints, 1698-1810: A Bibliography with Irving Lowens, American Music Education: Is It Better Than We Think? A Discussion of the Roles of Performance and Repertory, Together With Brief Mention of Certain Other Problems (which was published in Basic Concepts in Music Education), Research in Music Education, with Particular Reference to the Historic and Scientific (which appeared in Music in American Schools 1838-1988 from the University of Maryland). Personal papers written by Britton are part of the University of Maryland's Special Collections in Performing Arts.

== Honors and merits ==
- Inducted into the Music Educators National Conference (MENC) hall of fame 1986
- Invited to be the closing speaker at the University of Maryland's celebration of the sesquicentennial of Music in American Public Education Sponsored by MENC-1988
- The Michigan Music Educators Association Award of Merit
- University of Michigan Citation of Merit
- University of Illinois School of Music Alumni Association Distinguished Service Award
- MENC's History Special Research Interest Group Distinguished Service award (1996)
- For American Sacred Imprints, 1698-1810: A Bibliography, was given the Vincent H. Duckles award for the best book-length bibliography or other research tool in music

== Articles written by Britton ==
- Music Education in the Nineteen-Sixties. MUS ED J 47:23-6 n6 1961
- Thank You, Mr. President. MUS ED J Nov-December 1961, 33–36
- Music Education: an American Specialty. MUS ED J 48:27-9+ n6 1962
- The 1962 MENC Program. Port MUS ED J 48:45-8+ n4 1962
- The Development of Courses, Resources, and Activities for Performing Students. MUS ED J 45:42-4 n4 1964
- The General Theoretical Foundations of Music Education. MUS ED J 50:44-5 n5 1964
- Research in the United States. J RES MUS ED 17:108-11 n1 1969
- The Changing Scene. MUS ED J 56:109 May 1970
- La Educación Musical en los Estados Unidos de America. HETEROFONIA 7:13-17 n39 1974
- Keokuk to San Antonio: 75 Years of Change. MUS ED J 68:42-4 February 1982
- Founding JRME: A Personal View. J RES MUS ED 32:223-42 n4 1984
- Keynote Address, Sonneck-Society Liberty Supper Queensborough Community College 29 May 1976 SONNECK S 5:17-19 n3 1979
- The Sonneck Society and American Music. Port CHORAL J 28:28-9 n3 1987
- Research in Music Education, with particular Reference to the Historic and Scientific The How and Why of Teaching Singing Schools in Eighteenth Century America. CRME n99:23-41 Winter 1989
- MENC: Remembrances and Perspectives. QUARTERLY J OF MUS TEACHING 5:6-15 n2 1994
- In Celebration of 100 Years: The School of Music, University of Illinois at Urbana-Champaign: Reminiscences: Musical and other delights at Illinois, 1933-1938. CRME n125:9-19 Summer 1995
- Introduction to Twentieth-Century Brass Soloists: Bio-Critical Source Books on Musical Performance by Meckna, M. SONNECK S 21:29 n3 1995
