= Minnesota Sinfonia =

Minnesota Sinfonia is a professional non-profit orchestra in the U.S. state of Minnesota, founded in 1989 by artistic director Jay Fishman. The Minnesota Sinfonia is an independent, non-profit 501(c)(3) organization supported by corporate, foundation and individual contributors which performs for over 25,000 people each year.

== Programs ==
=== Music in the Schools ===
Music in the Schools (MIS) is the Sinfonia's inner-city education program. The orchestra develops a three-month curriculum with local teachers, focusing on a different core subject each year. Music in the Schools is designed specifically for public elementary students of Minneapolis and St. Paul with limited in-school arts opportunities, and the orchestra works with up to 12,000 elementary school students.

The culmination of each Music in the Schools program is "Sinfonia Day", a visit from the entire Minnesota Sinfonia to each participating school.

=== Young Artist Competition ===
The Young Artist Competition is an annual competition for musicians up to age 19. The competition is held every spring for residents of Minnesota, North Dakota, South Dakota, Iowa and Wisconsin. Both the junior and senior division winners are awarded solo appearances with the Sinfonia, and the senior division winner also receives the Claire Givens Violins $500 cash prize. The competition is held at the University of St. Thomas campus in St. Paul.

=== Youth Outreach Week ===
During Youth Outreach Week, 25 young musicians experience a "week in the life" of a professional musician. Students participate in a week of intensive orchestra rehearsals, culminating in a joint concert with the Minnesota Sinfonia.

=== Junior Composers Competition ===
Junior Composers and alumni up to age 19 compose original compositions that will be part of the Sinfonia's Young Artists Week. The winning entry is performed at the orchestra's Summer Concert Series.

== History ==
In 1989, conductor Jay Fishman created the Minnesota Sinfonia, a professional chamber orchestra to serve families, children, seniors, and those with limited incomes in Minnesota. Early on, the Sinfonia developed policies of free admission and children welcome to all performances.

Jay Fishman has been the artistic and executive director of the Minnesota Sinfonia since its inception in 1989.

It has been reported that the Minnesota Sinfonia will cease operations in January, 2025.
