= James Mursell =

British-born American pedagogist (1893-1963)

James Lockhart Mursell
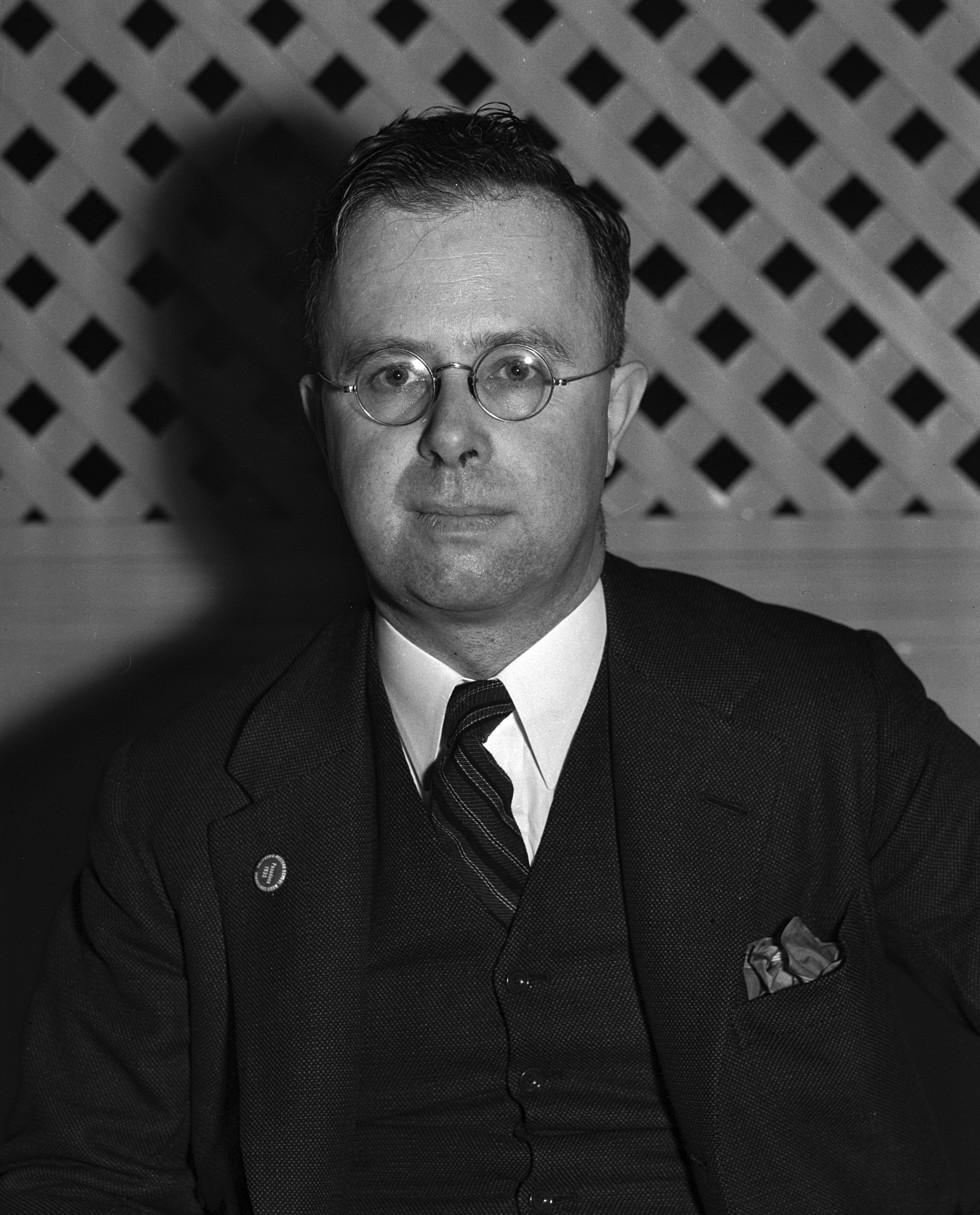
- Mursell in 1935
- Born: June 1, 1893; Derby, England
- Died: February 1, 1963; Jackson, New Hampshire, United States
- Occupations: Educator, psychologist, author
- Known for: Contributions to music education

Academic work
- Notable works: The Psychology of Music (1937); Music in American Schools (1943); Developmental Teaching (1949); Principles of Democratic Education (1955)

James Lockhart Mursell (b. Derby, England, June 1, 1893; d. Jackson, New Hampshire, Feb. 1, 1963) wrote extensively about music education and the use of music in a classroom setting. He emphasized the student's role in learning and believed that unless students are intrinsically motivated to learn, their musical growth will be minimal at best. In Mursell's view, the best motivator is the active, participatory musical experience — singing, playing, listening and being actively involved with good music. This is the all-important starting point for motivation, and it is from these experiences that musical growth can occur.

He applies his "synthesis-analysis-synthesis" (or whole-part-whole) pattern of learning to music education, and speaks of musical understanding as "unfolding or evolving, rather than adding or accumulating." Instead of teaching the rudiments of music in isolation from the context that gives them meaning, Mursell suggests that factual knowledge about music will gradually be gleaned from songs that students have learned and enjoy singing. Each time they sing a particular song, they do something different with it and learn a little more about it. In this way their understanding of melody, rhythm and dynamics deepens gradually as an outgrowth of meaningful music-making, rather than drill and practice. At the end of each such activity, when students sing the song through once more, it means more to them that it did prior to their "analysis" of it.

Mursell conceived of his pedagogical role as building “a bridge between our psychological knowledge and the practical teaching job,” by applying six principles: context, focus, social relationships, individuality, an ordered sequence and appropriate evaluation.

== Publications ==
Mursell's The Psychology of School Music Teaching (with Kansas City music supervisor Mabelle Glenn, 1931) and Human Values and Music Education (1934) became standard texts. "Principles of Music Education" appeared as the opening chapter in the 1936 yearbook of the National Society for the Study of Education, and Mursell was also a contributing author to the 1958 yearbook Basic Concepts in Music Education. In 1955 he published Principles of Democratic Education. In addition, his seminal book Music in American Schools was published in 1943, during World War II. In works like Developmental Teaching (1949), Mursell applied his psychological understanding to declare that pedagogically sound teaching requires that the subject matter must be structured to foster mental growth.

=== Works by James Lockhart Mursell ===
- 1932: The Psychology of Secondary-School Teaching. New York, NY: W.W. Norton & Co., Revised edition, 1939.
- 1934: Human Values in Music Education. New York, NY: Silver Burdett Co.
- 1936: Streamline Your Mind. London, England: C.A. Watts & Co.
- 1937: The Psychology of Music. New York, NY: W.W. Norton & Co., Reprinted 1970.
- 1942: A Personal Philosophy For War Time. Philadelphia, PA: J.B. Lippincott Co.
- 1943: Music in American Schools. New York, NY: Silver Burdett Co.
- 1946: Successful Teaching: Its Psychological Principles. New York, NY: McGraw-Hill, Second Edition, 1954
- 1947: Psychological Testing. New York, NY: Longmans, Green & Co.
- 1948: Education for Musical Growth. Toronto, Ontario: Ginn and Co.
- 1949: Developmental Teaching. New York, NY: McGraw-Hill.
- 1951: Music and the Classroom Teacher. New York, NY: Silver Burdett Co.
- 1953: How to Make and Break Habits. Philadelphia, PA: J.B. Lippincott Co.
- 1955: Principles of Democratic Education. New York, NY: W.W. Norton & Co.
- 1956: Music Education: Principles and Programs. Morristown, NJ: Silver Burdett Co.

=== As Co-Editor ===
(with Roy E. Freeburg, Beatrice Landeck, Harriet Nordholm, Gladys Tipton and Jack M. Watson):

- 1956: I Like the City. Morristown, NJ: Silver Burdett Co., illustrated by Feodor Rojankovsky
- 1956: I Like the Country. Morristown, NJ: Silver Burdett Co., illustrated by Feodor Rojankovsky
- 1956: Music for Living: Music Through the Day - Book 1. Morristown, NJ: Silver Burdett Co., illustrated by Feodor Rojankovsky
- 1956: Music for Living: Music In our Town - Book 2. Morristown, NJ: Silver Burdett Co., illustrated by Feodor Rojankovsky
- 1956: Music For Living: Music Now and Long Ago — Book 3. Morristown, NJ: Silver Burdett Co., illustrated by Feodor Rojankovsky
- 1956: Music For Living: Music Near and Far — Book 4. Morristown, NJ: Silver Burdett Co., illustrated by Feodor Rojankovsky
- 1956: Music For Living: Music Around the World — Book 6. Morristown, NJ: Silver Burdett Co., illustrated by Jean Mursell

(with H.B.Barnett, Roy E. Freeburg, Beatrice Landeck, Harriet Nordholm, Gladys Tipton, Jack M. Watson and Christine Wilcosz):

- 1961: Music For Living: Music in the Americas — Book 5. Toronto, Ontario: W.J. Gage Ltd., illustrated by Jean Mursell and Patricia Walker

=== Journal Articles ===
- “Psychological Research in Music Education” in Advanced School Digest, Vol. 6, No. 4, March 1940, pp. 73–76.
- “The Principle of Integration in Objective Psychology" in American Journal of Psychology, Vol. 35, No. 1, January 1924, pp. 1–15.
- “Is Progressive Education Through?” in American Mercury, Vol. 60, No. 258, June 1945, pp. 706–712, also in Progressive Education, Vol. 23, May 1946. pp. 246–251.
- “Place of Music in the Liberal Arts Curriculum” in Association of American Colleges Bulletin, Vol. 19, May 1933, pp. 230–235.
- “A Balanced Curriculum in Music Education” in Education, Vol. 56, No. 9, May 1936, pp. 521–526.
- “Education and Happiness” in Atlantic Monthly, Vol. 155, January 1935, pp. 84–89.
- “Miracle of Learning” in Atlantic Monthly, Vol. 155, June 1935, pp. 735–741.
- “Defeat of the Schools” in Atlantic Monthly, Vol. 163, March 1939, pp. 353–361.
- “Reform of the Schools” in Atlantic Monthly, Vol. 164, December 1939, pp. 803–809.
- “Acquisition of Skill” in Business Education World, Vol. 17, No. 3, November 1936, pp. 157–160.
- “Creation, not Routine, is the Secret of Learning” in Business Education World, Vol. 21, No. 8, April 1941, pp. 663–666.
- “Give and Take in Learning and Teaching” in Business Education World, Vol. 21, No. 9, May 1941, pp. 769–772.
- “Acquiring Consistency and Dependability” in Business Education World, Vol. 22, No. 1, September 1941, pp. 1–4.
- “The Rhythm of Learning” in Business Education World, Vol. 22, No. 2, October 1941.
- “Downing a Bogey” in Business Education World, Vol. 22, No. 3, November 1941, pp. 197–200.
- “How to Budget Practice Time” in Business Education World, Vol. 22, No. 7, March 1942, pp. 573–576.
- “Problem of Speed” in Business Education World, Vol. 22, No. 9, May 1942, pp. 753–756.
- “Comments on the Ten Commandments for Skill Building” in Business Education World, Vol. 24, No. 2, October 1943, pp. 63–65.
- “The Lesson Plan and its Psychological Development” in Business Education World, Vol. 27, No. 3, November 1946, pp. 137–139.

== See also ==
- Labuta, J.A. and Smith, D.A. (1997). Music Education: Historical Contexts and Perspectives. Upper Saddle River: Prentice Hall.
- Mark, M.L. and Gary, C.L. (1999). A History of American Music Education. Reston: National Association for Music Education.
- Simutis, Leonard J. (1961). James Lockhart Mursell as Music Educator. University of Ottawa, PhD thesis.
