= Minnesota Music Educators Association =

The Minnesota Music Educators Association (MMEA) is the Minnesota state-level affiliate of MENC: The National Association for Music Education. MMEA is a 2000-member professional society for music educators and is one of Minnesota's content education organizations. The program has operated for over sixty years. MMEA's stated mission is to provide "high quality music education for every student". MMEA annually conducts live auditions of Minnesota students for seven different All-State performing groups. These groups are Mixed Choir, Men's Choir, Women's Choir, Concert Band, Symphonic Band, Jazz Ensemble and Orchestra groups. The association also publishes a quarterly magazine, Interval.
