= Maryland Music Educators Association =

Association for school music educators

The Maryland Music Educators Association (MMEA) is a professional association for school music educators in the U.S. state of Maryland. Its mission is to provide enriched musical opportunities for students, encourage student participation in music, and improve the quality of music instruction.. MMEA is the Maryland state-level affiliate of the National Association for Music Education (NAfME).

MMEA provides student and teacher enrichment by sponsoring numerous student activities. The association has 8 annual All State music groups (Senior Band, Senior Mixed Chorus, Senior Women's Chorus, Senior Jazz Band, Senior Orchestra, Junior Band, Junior Chorus and Junior Orchestra) which are drawn from the entire state. A rigorous audition process selects about 920 students from the 6,000 to 7,000 students in secondary school music programs who audition for the groups. The student musicians spend several weeks in individual preparation and then come together for three days of intense rehearsals with a nationally known conductor. The sessions are open for teacher observation.

The Association also sponsors district and state Solo and Ensemble events, at which students play prepared selections for an adjudicator, who in turn gives them feedback on their performance as soloists or members of small ensembles. Those who qualify at a district event by earning the highest rating may go on the state event. This spring, the State Solo and Ensemble events heard performances from nearly 6,000 students.

MMEA serves its members by providing in-service activities for music teachers at a Fall In-Service Day and at a two-day conference in February. Nationally, regionally, and locally recognized clinicians provide sessions that focus on every level of the profession—early childhood through university level instruction, including special learners and at all content areas—band, chorus, general, orchestra, theory, history, technology, and world music.

The secondary music performance curriculum of each district is assessed at the district level of all school systems. Using a graded list of literature, each school band, chorus, and orchestra in the state is adjudicated by a panel of three performance adjudicators as well as a sight-reading adjudicator. Ensembles that qualify through the district events are invited to the State Band, Choral and Orchestra Festivals. During the spring, Orchestras, Bands and Choruses performed in these festivals, with nearly 10,000 students participating.

== Controversies ==
In 2013-2014, MMEA was criticized by proponents of home schooling for its student eligibility policy which requires students attend an independent (private), parochial, or public school in Maryland and meet the class membership and grade designations to be eligible to participate. The Virginia Music Educators Association has provisions to include students who participate in a home school band, orchestra, or choral programs.
