= Deep Thinkers =

American hip hop act

- Origin: Kansas City, Missouri
- Genres: Hip hop
- Years active: 2000s
- Members: Aaron Sutton (Brother of Moses), Kyle Dykes (Leonard Dstroy)

Deep Thinkers is an American hip hop group from Kansas City, Missouri composed of MC Aaron Sutton (Brother of Moses) and DJ and producer Kyle Dykes (Leonard D. Story, Leonard Dstroy, or Lenny D).

Sutton and Dykes first met each other while performing in the live band Sevenfold Symphony and have been credited with playing an essential role in developing the Kansas City hip-hop scene. Sutton regularly volunteers in the Kansas City community, and is also an oil painter.

The group's lyrics center on social issues such as politics, homelessness, and poverty. Its beats are composed of a myriad of samples, including those of 1970s funk music, jazz, and world music. Deep Thinkers has performed with artists including Del tha Funkee Homosapien and Mac Lethal.

== Discography ==
- Outlook (self-released, 2003)
- Necks Move (Datura Records, 2005)
- Don't Call It A Mixtape Vol. 1 (Symbol Heavy, 2006)
- Reprogram (INnatesounds, 2007)
- Make It Quake (Wilshire District Music, 2009)

== See also ==
- American hip hop
- Conscious hip hop
