= E. Thayer Gaston =

American psychologist (1901–1970)

Everett Thayer Gaston (July 4, 1901 – 1970) was a psychologist active in the 1940s–1960s who helped develop music therapy in the United States, describing the qualities of musical expression that could be therapeutic. He worked at the University of Kansas, as Professor of Music Education and Director of Music Therapy. He was named to the Music Educators Hall of Fame in 1986.

== Values ==
He outlined three principles (values) that are a primary source of direction for the use of music in therapy:

1. The establishment or re-establishment of interpersonal relationships.
2. The bringing about of self-esteem through self-actualization.
3. The utilization of the unique potential of rhythm to energize and bring order.

The values are further explained in Gaston's book "Music in Therapy".

== Views ==
- Music is a means of nonverbal communication deriving potency from its wordless meaning.
- Music is the most adaptable of the arts being utilized with individuals, groups, and in various locations.
- Through participation or listening, music may lessen feelings of loneliness.
- Music elicits moods derived from emotions and has the capability of communicating one's good feeling for another.
- Music can dissolve fears of closeness because its nonverbal nature allows an intimacy that is nonthreatening.
- Music, in most cases, is sound without associated threat.
- The shared musical experience can be a form of structured reality upon which the therapist and the patient can form a relationship with some confidence.
- Musical experiences possess an intimacy because listeners and performers derive their own responses from each musical experience.
- Preparation and performance of music can bring about a feeling of accomplishment and gratification.
