= David J. Elliott =

David J. Elliott is a Canadian musician and academic. He is a professor of music and music education at the Steinhardt School of Culture, Education, and Human Development of New York University, in New York in the United States. He previously taught at the University of Toronto in Canada. He is also an award-winning jazz composer and arranger, as well as a jass tromonist in New York City. He has published several books, including:

- David J. Elliott (1995). Music Matters: A New Philosophy of Music Education. New York: Oxford University Press.
- David J. Elliot (2014). Music Matters: A Philosophy of Music Education (Second Edition).Oxford University Press. Published June/July 2014 (with subsequent printings and expanded digital formats). The book has been translated into Chinese, Korean, and Japanese.
- ——— (editor) (2005). Praxial Music Education: Reflections and Dialogues. New York: Oxford University Press.
- Kari K. Veblen, Stephen J. Messenger, Marissa Silverman, David J. Elliott (editors) (2013). Community Music Today. New York: Rowman & Littlefield.
- ——— , Marissa Silverman, Wayne D. Bowman (editors) (2016). Artistic Citizenship: Artistry, Social Responsibility, and Ethical Praxis. New York: Oxford University Press.
