= International Society for Music Education =

International organization

- Abbreviation: ISME
- Formation: July 7, 1953; 73 years ago
- Type: Learned society
- Legal status: Society
- Purpose: Educational
- Headquarters: Melbourne, Australia
- Region served: Worldwide
- Members: music education professionals
- Official language: English
- President: Bo-wah Leung
- Immediate Past President: Emily Akuno
- President Elect: Patricia Gonzalez
- Key people: Ryan Zellner, CEO
- Main organ: General Assembly
- Affiliations: International Music Council, UNESCO
- Website: www.isme.org

The International Society for Music Education (ISME) is a professional organization of persons involved with music education. It was founded in Brussels in 1953 during the UNESCO-sponsored conference on "The Role and Place of Music in the Education of Youth and Adults". ISME's mission is to build a worldwide network of music educators, to advocate music education globally and across the lifespan, and to foster intercultural understanding and cooperation.

== Activities ==
The society holds conferences every two years in a different part of the world and include workshops, paper presentations, keynote addresses, symposia, and performances. In addition, ISME supports regional conferences in Africa, Asia Pacific, Europe, and the Americas, and has a range of specialist interest groups to nurture particular areas of music education. These specialist groups include seven long-established commissions that are focused on: research; community music activity; early childhood music education; education of the professional musician; policy: culture, education and media; music in schools and teacher education; and music in special education, music therapy and music medicine. Each commission holds a biennial seminar, usually immediately prior to the main conference. In addition, the world conference includes a forum for instrumental and vocal teachers.

the society's main sponsor is the NAMM Foundation.

== Publications ==
The International Journal of Music Education is the official journal of the society and is published four times a year by SAGE Publications. Each year the society also produces a series of academic books through Routledge.

== Co-ordination and advisory work ==
The ISME International Office co-ordinates all communication related to the work of the society. The society acts in an advisory capacity to UNESCO and is a member of and closely affiliated to the International Music Council.
