= Harry Broudy =

Polish-American philosopher (1905–1998)

- Born: July 27, 1905; Filipów, Grodno Governorate, Russian Empire
- Died: June 24, 1998 (aged 92); Urbana, Illinois, US

Academic background
- Education: Harvard University (PhD); Boston University (AB)
- Thesis: The Metaphysical Presuppositions of Personal Existence (1935)

Academic work
- Discipline: Philosophy of education
- Institutions: University of Illinois at Urbana-Champaign, Framingham State Teachers College, North Adams State Teachers College

Harry Samuel Broudy (July 27, 1905 – June 24, 1998) was a Polish-born American professor of the philosophy of education.

== Early life and education ==
Broudy was born in Filipów, Grodno Governorate (part of the Russian partition of the Polish–Lithuanian Commonwealth) in the Russian Empire on July 27, 1905, but his family emigrated, and moved to Milford, Massachusetts in 1912. Broudy attended the Massachusetts Institute of Technology for a year, but then transferred to Boston University, where he received his bachelor's degree in German literature and philosophy in 1929. From there, he went to Harvard University and earned his master's degree and Ph.D. there (both in philosophy), completing the doctorate in 1935. His thesis title was The Metaphysical Presuppositions of Personal Existence.

== Career ==
Broudy worked for a short time at the Massachusetts Department of Education, where he supervised correspondence education. He taught philosophy of education and educational psychology at North Adams State Teachers College from 1937 until 1949, then moved to Framingham State Teachers College from 1949 until 1957. He moved to the University of Illinois at Urbana-Champaign as a professor of the philosophy of education in 1957, where he spent the rest of his career at Illinois. He retired from the full time appointment in 1974 and was appointed as a professor emeritus, in which role he stayed active until the early 1990s.

== Work ==
Broudy's philosophical views were based on the tradition of classical realism, dealing with truth, goodness, and beauty. However he was also influenced by the modern philosophies existentialism and instrumentalism. In his textbook Building a Philosophy of Education he has two major ideas that are the main points to his philosophical outlook: The first is truth and the second is universal structures to be found in humanity's struggle for education and the good life. Broudy also studied issues on society's demands on school. He thought education would be a link to unify the diverse society and urged the society to put more trust and a commitment to the schools and a good education.

== Awards and honors ==
Broudy was appointed as a laureate of Kappa Delta Pi in 1968. Volume 25, issue 4 of the Journal of Aesthetic Education was dedicated to essays in honor of Broudy.

== Personal life ==
Broudy was naturalized as a United States citizen in 1936. He died on June 24, 1998, in Urbana, Illinois.

== Selected books ==
- Broudy, Harry S. (1961). Building a philosophy of education. Prentice-Hall. OCLC 181215.
- Broudy, Harry S. (1972). The real world of the public schools. Harcourt Brace Jovanovich. ISBN 0-15-175965-0. OCLC 446321.
- Broudy, Harry S. (1988). The uses of schooling. Routledge. ISBN 0-415-00176-5. OCLC 16804578.
