= National Association for Music Education =

U.S. nonprofit organization

- Abbreviation: NAfME
- Formation: 1907; 119 years ago
- Founder: Hamlin Cogswell
- Founded at: Keokuk, Iowa
- Type: 501(c)(3) organization
- Tax ID no.: 52-6045043
- Legal status: Active
- Purpose: Music education in the United States
- Headquarters: Herndon, Virginia
- Coordinates: 38.967059°N 77.380270°W
- President: Deb Confredo
- Interim Executive Director: Chris Wodside
- Website: nafme.org
- Formerly called: Music Educators National Conference

The National Association for Music Education (NAfME) is an organization of American music educators dedicated to advancing and preserving music education as part of the core curriculum of schools in the United States. Founded in 1907 as the Music Supervisors National Conference (MSNC), the organization was known from 1934 to 1998 as the Music Educators National Conference (origin of the MENC acronym). From 1998 to 2011 it was known as "MENC: The National Association for Music Education." On September 1, 2011, the organization changed its acronym from MENC to NAfME. On March 8, 2012, the organization's name legally became National Association for Music Education, using the acronym "NAfME". It has approximately 58,000 members, and NAfME's headquarters are located in Herndon, Virginia

As of January 2025, Deb Confredo is the current president of NAfME, and the interim executive director is Christopher Woodside.

== Organization and Early History ==
In 1956, a former MENC Executive Secretary prepared a chronology of the organization's genesis and growth: "1905—First discussion of organizing a separate conference of [K-12] music supervisors at the meeting of NEA music section, Asbury Park, NJ (July 2–7); 1906—First call issued November 27 for a School Music Supervisors Conference in Keokuk, Iowa; 1907—With 69 present, 'Music Supervisors National Conference' established in Keokuk (10-12 April); 1910—Constitution adopted, first recorded committee report, first book of proceedings published. Affiliate relationship established with National Federation of Music Clubs; 1914—'Music Supervisors Bulletin' (later 'Music Educators Journal') established. First report of Committee on Community Songs; 1915—Beginning of an emphasis on community music activities and community service by school music supervisors and music teachers; 1917—First National Music Supervisors Chorus; 1918—National Education Council established, Eastern Music Supervisors Conference organized; 1919—Music appreciation comes to the foreground... 'Service Version' of 'The Star-Spangled Banner' accepted by U.S. War Department upon recommendation of Conference-sponsored 'Committee of Twelve'; 1920—State Advisory Committees established; 1922—Southern Conference for Music Education organized; 1923—introduction of slogan, 'Music For Every Child—Every Child for Music'; 1924—Biennial plan proposed for meeting of National and Sectional Conferences; 1925—First National High School Band Contest sponsored; 1926—First National High School Orchestra; 1927—North Central and Southwestern Conferences hold first meetings; 1928—First National High School Chorus established; 1929—First meeting of Northwest Conference; 1930—office opened in Chicago; 1931—California-Western (later 'Western') Conference holds first meeting, completing the circuit of six Sectional Conferences; 1934—Name change from Music Supervisors National Conference to Music Educators National Conference; 1940—Beginning of cooperation with Pan-American Union and State Department in 'Good Neighbor' program, first meeting of College Band Directors Conference; WWII—Intensive cooperation with agencies & organizations including the State Dept., Treasury Dept., War Dept., Library of Congress Music Division; 1947—First student chapters enrolled; 1951—MENC Washington, DC office opens in NEA headquarters; 1953—First issue of ' Journal of Research in Music Education'; 1955—MENC becomes member of National Music Council.

== State affiliates ==
NAfME functions regionally through more than fifty state (or state-level) affiliates. These federated state associations include organizations representing each of the fifty U.S. states; the District of Columbia; and a single affiliate for Europe.

- Alabama Music Educators Association (AMEA)
- Alaska Music Educators Association (AMEA)
- Arizona Music Educators Association (AMEA)
- Arkansas Music Educators Association (ArkMEA)
- California Music Educators Association (CMEA)
- Colorado Music Educators Association (CMEA)
- Connecticut Music Educators Association (CMEA)
- Delaware Music Educators Association (DMEA)
- District of Columbia Music Educators Association (DCMEA)
- European Music Educators Association (EMEA)
- Florida Music Education Association (FMEA)
- Georgia Music Educators Association (GMEA)
- Hawaii Music Educators Association (HMEA)
- Idaho Music Educators Association (IMEA)
- Illinois Music Educators Association (ILMEA)
- Indiana Music Education Association (IMEA)
- Iowa Music Educators Association (IMEA)
- Kansas Music Educators Association (KMEA)
- Kentucky Music Educators Association (KMEA)
- Louisiana Music Educators Association (LMEA)
- Maine Music Educators Association (MMEA)
- Maryland Music Educators Association (MMEA)
- Massachusetts Music Educators Association (MMEA)
- Michigan Music Educators Association (MMEA)
- Minnesota Music Educators Association (MMEA)
- Mississippi Music Educators Association (MMEA)
- Missouri Music Educators Association (MMEA)
- Montana Music Educators Association (MMEA)
- Nebraska Music Educators Association (NMEA)
- Nevada Music Educators Association (NMEA)
- New Hampshire Music Educators Association (NHMEA)
- New Jersey Music Educators Association (NJMEA)
- New Mexico Music Educators Association (NMMEA)
- New York State School Music Association (NYSSMA)
- North Carolina Music Educators Association (NCMEA)
- North Dakota Music Educators Association (NDMEA)
- Ohio Music Education Association (OMEA)
- Oklahoma Music Educators Association (OkMEA)
- Oregon Music Education Association (OMEA)
- Pennsylvania Music Educators Association (PMEA)
- Rhode Island Music Educators Association (RIMEA)
- South Carolina Music Educators Association (SCMEA)
- South Dakota Music Educators Association (SDMEA)
- Tennessee Music Education Association (TMEA)
- National Association for Music Education – Texas (NAfME-Texas)
- Utah Music Educators Association (UMEA)
- Vermont Music Educators Association (VMEA)
- Virginia Music Educators Association (VMEA)
- Washington Music Educators Association (WMEA)
- West Virginia Music Educators Association (WVMEA)
- Wisconsin Music Educators Association (WMEA)
- Wyoming Music Educators Association (WMEA)

== Women leadership ==
Hamlin Cogswell (1852–1922) founded the Music Supervisors National Conference in 1907. While a small number of women served as president of the Music Supervisors National Conference (and the following renamed versions of the organization over the next century) in the early 20th century, there were only two female presidents between 1952 and 1992, which "possibly reflects discrimination." After 1990, however, leadership roles for women in the organization opened up. From 1990 to 2010, there were five female presidents of this organization. Women music educators "outnumber men two-to-one" in teaching general music, choir, private lessons, and keyboard instruction. More men tend to be hired for band education, administration and jazz jobs, and more men work in colleges and universities. According to Dr. Sandra Wieland Howe, there is still a "glass ceiling" for women in music education careers, as there is "stigma" associated with women in leadership positions and "men outnumber women as administrators."

=== Notable women presidents ===
- Frances Clarke (1860–1958) was a music supervisor in the Milwaukee Public School system. She founded the Music Supervisors National Conference in 1907. It was an organization of American music educators dedicated to advancing and preserving music education as part of the core curriculum of schools in the United States. In 2011, it was renamed the National Association for Music Education and it had more than 130,000 members.
- Mabelle Glenn (1881–1969) was a music supervisor in Bloomington, Indiana and a director of music in Kansas City, Missouri. She wrote music appreciation books and music textbooks. She was president of the Music Supervisors National Conference from 1928 to 1930.
- Lilla Pitts (1884–1970) graduated from Northwestern University. She was a faculty member of the teacher's college at Florida State University. She served as president of the Music Educators National Conference (the new name for the Music Supervisors National Conference) from 1942 to 1944.
- Marguerite Hood (1903–1992) graduated from the University of Southern California. She was a supervisor of music for Montana, a faculty member at the University of Montana, the University of Southern California and the University of Michigan. She was president of the Music Educators National Conference from 1950 to 1952. She was the first woman to be appointed as chair of the Music Educators Journal.
- Frances Andrews (1908–1976) received her master's and doctorate from Pennsylvania State University, where she was a faculty member from 1943 to 1973. She was president of the Music Educators National Conference from 1970 to 1972.
- Mary Hoffman (1926–1997) graduated with a bachelor's degree in science from Lebanon Valley College and a master's from Columbia Teachers College. She was a music supervisor in Milwaukee and Philadelphia. She gave graduate courses at Columbia Teachers College, Temple University and the University of Illinois. She wrote and contributed to textbooks. She was president of the Music Educators National Conference from 1980 to 1982.
- Dorothy Straub (born 1941) graduated with bachelor's and master's degrees in music education from Indiana University. She was the music coordinator for Fairfield Public Schools in Connecticut. She was a violinist in two orchestras. She was given awards from the American String Teachers Association and the National School Orchestra Association. She was president of the Music Educators National Conference from 1992 to 1994.
- Carolynn Lindeman (born 1940) graduated from Oberlin College Conservatory of Music, the Mozarteum Academy, San Francisco State University and Stanford University, where she received her Doctor of Musical Arts. She was a professor at San Francisco State University from 1973 to 2005. She was president of the Music Educators National Conference from 1996 to 1998. She edited the "Strategies for Teaching" series. She "[a]cknoledge[d] discrimination in academia."
- June Hinckley (1943–2007) graduated with a PhD from Florida State University. She was a music and fine arts supervisor in Brevard County in Florida. She wrote articles on music education. She was president of the Music Educators National Conference from 1998 to 2000.
- Lynn Brinckmeyer received her PhD from the University of Kansas. She was an associate professor and director of choral music education at Texas State University. She was president of the Music Educators National Conference from 2006 to 2008.
- Barbara Geer graduated from the University of North Carolina. She was a music consultant for a school system in North Carolina. She was president of the Music Educators National Conference from 2008 to 2010.

== Lowell Mason Fellowship ==
Lowell Mason Fellows are individuals who have furthered NAfME's mission of ensuring accessibility to music education for all. Music educators, music education advocates, political leaders, and key decision makers are eligible for designation. The names of the Fellows are permanently displayed at NAfME's headquarters in Herndon, VA. The Fellowship is named after Lowell Mason.

== See also ==
- American Choral Directors Association
- Music Teachers National Association
- American String Teachers Association
- Tanglewood Symposium, a conference in 1967 sponsored by the Music Educators National Conference whose Declaration called for music to be placed in the core of the school curriculum
