= Double =

Double, The Double or Dubble may refer to:

== Mathematics and computing ==
- Multiplication by 2
- Double precision, a floating-point representation of numbers that is typically 64 bits in length
- A double number of the form $x+yj$, where $j^2=+1$
- A 2-tuple, or ordered list of two elements, commonly called an ordered pair, denoted $(a,b)$
- Double (manifold), in topology

== Food and drink ==
- A drink order of two shots of hard liquor in one glass
- A "double decker", a hamburger with two patties in a single bun
- Doubles (food), a street food originating in Trinidad and Tobago

== Games ==
- Double, action in games whereby a competitor raises the stakes
  - double, in contract bridge
  - Doubling cube, in backgammon
  - Double, doubling a blackjack bet in a favorable situation
  - Double, a bet offered by UK bookmakers which combines two selections
- Double, villain in the video game Mega Man X4
- A kart racing game Mario Kart: Double Dash
- An arcade action game Double Dragon

== Sports ==
- Double (association football), the act of a winning a division and primary cup competition in the same season
- Double (baseball), a two-base hit in baseball
  - The Double (Seattle Mariners), Edgar Martinez's walk-off double in Game 5 of the 1995 American League Division Series
- Double (cricket), the feat of scoring a thousand first-class runs and taking a hundred first-class wickets in a single season
- Double (volleyball), scoring ten or more in a statistical category (aces, kills, blocks, digs, or assists) in a single match
- Double (Gaelic games), the act of winning the All-Ireland Senior Football Championship and the All-Ireland Senior Hurling Championship in the same year
- Double (rugby league), winning the Super League and Challenge Cup in one season
- Double-double (basketball), accumulating ten or more in two key statistical categories – points, rebounds, assists, steals, and blocked shots – in a single game
- Double Duty, competing in the Indianapolis 500 and Coca-Cola 600 on the same day or weekend.

== Entertainment ==
=== Literature ===
- The Double (Dostoevsky novel), an 1846 novella by Fyodor Dostoevsky
- The Double (Saramago novel), a 2002 novel by José Saramago
- Double (manga), a 2019 manga series by Ayako Noda

=== Film and television ===
- Double (filmmaking), someone who substitutes for the credited actor of a character
- The Double (1934 film), a German crime comedy film
- The Double (1963 film), a British film, part of the Edgar Wallace Mysteries series
- The Double (1971 film), an Italian film
- The Double (2011 film), a spy thriller film
- The Double (2013 film), a film based on the Dostoevsky novella
- The Double (TV series), a 2024 Chinese historical drama
- Kamen Rider Double, a 2009–10 Japanese television series
  - Kamen Rider Double (character), the protagonist in a Japanese television series of the same name

=== Music ===
- Double album, audio album spanning two units of the primary medium in which it is sold, typically records and CDs
- Double variation, a variation form in music
- Double (band), a Swiss pop duo
- Double (singer) (born 1975), a Japanese R&B singer
- Double (Roch Voisine album) (1990)
- Double (Zhao Wei album) (2005)
- "Double" (BoA song) (2003)
- "Double", a song by Blackbear from Digital Druglord (2017)
- "Double", by Yeat from 2 Alive (2022)
- "The Double", an instrumental by Clint Mansell from the Black Swan soundtrack (2010)
- The Double Violin Concerto (Bach) in D minor, BWV 1043, commonly referred to as "The Double" among violinists

== People ==
- Baron Emile Double (1869–1938), vigneron who established the vineyard at Château de Beaupré
- François-Joseph Double (1776–1842), French physician
- Marie-Louise Double de Saint-Lambert (1891–1974), French philanthropist later known as Countess Lily Pastré
- Steve Double (born 1966), British politician and Member of Parliament

== Places ==
- Double (lunar crater), in Mare Tranquillitatis
- Double Lake, a lake in Minnesota, US

== Other uses ==
- Double, also called a look-alike or doppelgänger, one person or being that resembles another
- Polish Enigma double, a machine replicating the function of Nazi Germany's cipher machines
- Double, a former fraction of the Guernsey pound
- Double, a former rank of liturgical feast in the Roman Rite of the Catholic Church
- Dubbel, a strong Belgian Trappist beer or, more generally, a strong brown ale
- A double, a shorthand for an instance of double tradition, verses duplicated in the Biblical gospels of Matthew and Luke

== See also ==
- Doubles (disambiguation)
- Doubling (disambiguation)
