= Music education and programs within the United States =

Music education in the United States is implemented in many schools as a form of modern-day teaching. Music education is a field of study that focuses on the teaching and application of music in the classroom. As this addition to the curriculum progresses, the effects and implications to this course of study are being widely debated, especially the factors pertaining to. Researchers are able to follow its progression from its earliest known application within the field of academics.

== History ==
The earliest systematic music education in the country was centered on the training of singers for Protestant church services, to lead the congregation in psalm-singing. In the 18th century, the first singing schools in the country were founded, and a number of legendary traveling singing masters traveled New England, teaching in barns, schoolhouses and other informal locations; these masters included Francis Hopkinson and William Billings. By the end of the century, more formal singing schools in cities like Savannah, Philadelphia and Boston became social singing societies.

Public education in the United States first offered music as part of the curriculum in Boston in the 1830s, and it spread through the help of singing teacher Lowell Mason, after he successfully advocated it to the Boston School Committee in 1838. The committee ultimately decided to include music as a curricular subject because it was of a moral, physical, and intellectual nature. Music was considered moral because it played such a part in religion, as well as the fact that it had been documented to produce "happiness, contentment, cheerfulness, and tranquility." It was of a physical nature because singing was exercise for the lungs. The committee justified music's intellectual nature by stating that it had been studied as a part of the quadrivium in the Middle Ages, and that it "contributes to memory, comparison, attention, and intellectual faculties."

Another advocate of music in public education was Swiss educational reformer Johann Heinrich Pestalozzi. Pestalozzi believed that nature was the ultimate and original source of knowledge, therefore his educational theories placed a high value on sensory, kinesthetic, and active learning. He felt students should start with simple concepts in all subjects and move later to more complex ideas. Pestalozzi's method was one of the earliest methods that could be considered "student-centered learning" and his ideas of discipline and a student-teacher rapport based on love and trust were markedly different from the common practice of corporal punishment at the time. The first music educator to use Pestalozzian ideas in teaching music was Hans Negeli, a colleague of Pestalozzi in Switzerland. His Pestalozzian approach to music was brought to the United States, translated, and popularized by William Channing Woodbridge, Elam Ives, and Lowell Mason. This approach prized active and sensory learning, taught sounds before signs, separated music into melody, rhythm, and expression, and also moved from the simple to complex within the context of each element. Many of these ideas are found in later established music teaching methods, such as Orff-Schulwerk, Kodály, and, Dalcroze-Eurthymics.

Music education, primarily vocal, remained most common in women's schools, though many private academies also existed, offering boys and girls instruction in orchestral instruments like the violin, viola, cello and piano.

In the mid-19th century, educator Luther Whiting Mason established music education in the schools of Cincinnati, and become a prominent author of textbooks. His National Music Course, first published in 1870, was a widely adopted standard part of many American curricula. Music education continued to expand across the country, and gained in respect as an essential part of educational development. There was a music section in the National Education Association by the 1890s.

=== The scientific method and how it affected music ===
After the Civil War, pragmatism and the scientific aspects of sequential skill building, accurate evaluations, examinations, systematic teaching methods, and scientific methods were popular in education. Music educators' responses showed that music could be studied scientifically through the use of different methodologies, systematic textbooks and graded music series, and instructional material for teachers. The scientific and more pragmatic goals of education in the nineteenth century had a profound effect on the development of music education in the schools.

=== Two methodologies: rote vs. note ===
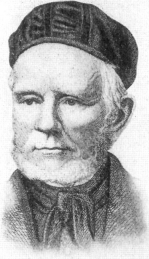
Lowell Mason

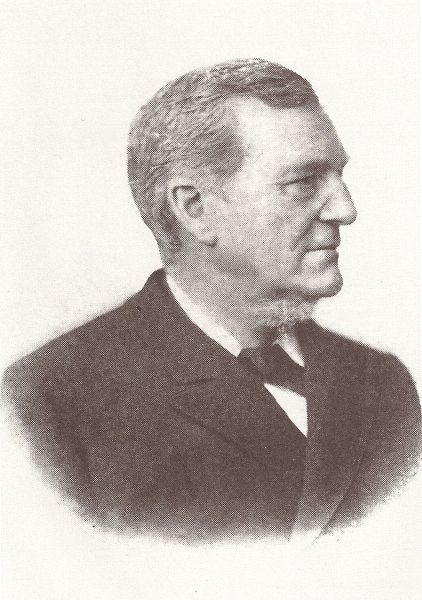
Luther Whiting Mason

Two main methodologies used to teach music were the "rote" method and the "note" method. The rote method followed many Pestalozzian ideologies. Songs were taught first and musical ideas were presented later, one at time, carefully and systematically. Singing by rote was the basis for this methodology. Lowell Mason authored what is believed to be the first music series using the rote method. Lowell Mason's The Song Garden from 1864 set the stage for other rote methodologies of the late nineteenth century. Luther Whiting Mason was a prominent rote method name presented in the textbook. Luther Mason was employed in Cincinnati schools but later moved to Boston to be the "superintendent of music in the primary schools". Luther Mason wrote school textbooks using rote methodology. The National Music Course, published by Ginn in 1870, had seven books presented in a sequential approach of using rote songs to teach music reading. (p. 196) Luther Mason included very detailed lesson plans for the classroom teacher, since at the time music was taught by the classroom teacher but overseen by a music specialist. The series was designed for fifteen minutes of music instruction each day given by the classroom teacher and overseen by a music educator once per week. The book series was so popular Luther Mason was invited to apply his methods in Japan and Germany. The rote method was less favored than the "note" method later in the nineteenth century. However, the debate continues today.

An example of the note method is Joseph Bird's 1861 Vocal Music Reader and Benjamin Jepson's three-book series using "note" methodology. The Elementary Music Reader was published in 1871 by the Barnes Company, one year after Luther Mason's The National Music Course. Benjamin Jepson was a military man turned music teacher in New Haven after an injury in the war. His music textbooks had exercises and songs presented systematically for the goal of music reading and sight-singing. Jepson later published two revisions of his series under the names The Standard Music Reader in 1888, and in 1904 The New Standard Music Reader. Following in Jepson's footsteps of note methodology were Hosea Edson Holt and John Wheeler Tufts, who wrote The Normal Music Course published in 1883 (twelve years after Jepson's The Elementary Music Reader). Click here to read the Normal Music Course. This series had five books all geared toward sight-singing and reading music. A few other note methodology textbook were presented to show the seriousness of music reading as a scientific and pragmatic study. These other note methodology books included: The Graded School Singer by Blackman and Whittemore-1873, and the Cincinnati Schools' The Young Singer-1860, The Young Singer's Manual-1866, and the Cincinnati Music Reader-1893. The culmination of the scientific method and note methodology advances was presented in Thomas Tapper's and Frederick Ripley's The National Music Course published in 1895. The book focused on a no-nonsense systematic approach to music literacy to develop beauty in singing. It emphasized the systematic and pragmatic delivery of materials.

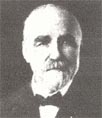
Philip C. Hayden

Music Education in the United States took a big turn with the creation of the Music Supervisors National Conference. The first meeting of the Music Supervisors Conference was held on April 10–12, 1907 in Keokuk, Iowa, at Westminster Presbyterian Church. A music educator by the name of Philip C. Hayden made the first meeting possible by sending invitations and announcing the meeting in the Music School Monthly of which Hayden was the founder and editor of the publication. The gathering was primarily meant for educators to come observe new teaching techniques in rhythm and observe Hayden's music students.

During the three-day convention, music demonstrations took place provided by Hayden and his students. Informal discussions on current topics in music education would also take place during the convention. Future conventions and clinics would be based on this model. Throughout the convention, many educators discussed the importance of having a more permanent organization dedicated to music supervisors and teaching techniques. On the last day of the convention, a forum of sixty-nine music supervisors voted to have another convention and became charter-members of an organization that would remain nameless.

The Music Supervisors National Conference was officially established during the third meeting of the organization in Cincinnati in 1910 with the adoption of the constitution and bylaws. As the role of the music supervisor changed into more of an administrative position, the conference began to focus primarily on the teaching methods provided in the classroom. At the 1934 Chicago meeting, members decided to change the name to Music Educators National Conference.

Since the inception of Music Supervisors National Conference, the organization has worked diligently in making sure that every student has access to music instruction in the public school system provided by a qualified music teacher.

Vocal instruction dominated public schooling at all levels. Instrumental education was handled largely through private enterprise, until the early 20th century. Inspired by the band music of Frederick Innes, John Philip Sousa and others, many schools offered orchestral instrument bands. This accelerated following World War I, when many soldiers returned with knowledge and interest in the band music they learned as soldiers.

The first formal school for music educators was founded in 1884, in Potsdam, New York, by Julia Ettie Crane, but Oberlin Conservatory in Ohio in the 1920s became the first school to offer a four-year degree in music education.

== Concert and marching bands ==
=== All-female high school, military, and performance bands ===
Bands during the mid to late nineteenth century were an integral part of every community. These bands would march in parades, provide free concerts, supported soldiers, and played for those in hospitals. During the golden age of bands which occurred from 1865 to 1917, there were approximately over 10,000 brass bands in existence across the country. The band membership did consist of males, but past photographs indicate that there were also all women bands. The female bands continued their popularity into the twentieth century and influenced the evolution of the high school band from totally male to the integration of female into the programs. High schools often housed the standard male band, but also often included a female band. There were also female bands created to support industry. With the beginning of WW II, female bands expanded into women's military bands. These bands were created to entertain female troops, sell war bonds, and perform at concerts, graduations, dances, parades, and hospitals (2008). The WAC (Woman's Army Corps) bands were used to entertain injured soldiers returning from the war.

One Ohio music educator, Joan A. Lamb, provided great contributions to world of military bands. Lamb was a public music teacher until enrolling in the Women's Army Auxiliary Corps later known as WAC. In her basic training, she was asked to become a candidate for officer, but she insisted she had joined to play in the WAC band. She was even sent to a psychiatrist because of her persistence in the effort to become a member of the band. Finally, she located the WAC band director, auditioned for him with her oboe, and was immediately reassigned to the band. Lamb held several music positions within the band which was a first for women. She graduated from Army Music School, directed the 400th WAC Band, started an African American WAC Band, and performed in the Armed Forces Radio Orchestra. After her service in the WACS, she returned to her life as a music teacher, educator, and administrator in Los Angeles public schools where she served for 30 years.

African-American women also wanted to serve in the WAC Band. A 404 WAC Band was created. The WAC branch of the military was the only branch who allowed African American female bands. The Coast Guard also created their version of the female band. The SPAR Band played for the troops and performed many of the same activities as the WAC Band. After the war, the SPAR Band was disbanded and the Coast Guard again became all male. After the war, the female SPAR band members became teachers, performers, and parents. There were some female members of the WAC and SPAR military bands who used the G.I Bill to go to college while others continued performing professionally post war. During the war, women's swing bands also became popular replacing the male counterpart serving in the war effort. These swing bands were highly successful and were well received by the public longing for a diversion from the war effort.

The Ingenues was an all-female jazz band popular in the late 1920s through the 1930s. This performing band would often appear in vaudeville and variety theaters. Anna Mae Winburn was an African American band leader of an all-female jazz band called the International Sweethearts of Rhythm. Frances Klein was another famous female instrumentalist of the 30s and 40s who played in Kermit Dart's All-Girl Band, under the direction of Irene Vermillion.

The women military bands and postwar all-female bands opened the door to more female participation in instrumental music. Through the efforts of these frontier-like women, perspectives changed as to the female purpose and level of reliability. Suddenly, female bands were found to be as entertaining as male bands. Women found a place and purpose in the entertainment world. Women who were thought to only have the ability to be mothers were leaders in the music world. Women's equality began to emerge during this time in history and music was a primary avenue for the movement. These women of the past created an environment which the women of today now enjoy. This environment is one of fairness and the ability to seek success in all career areas. Women of today attend college and may become professionals in the work force. Women like Joan Lamb conquered what had in the past seemed like a forbidden world.

=== High school music programs during World War II ===
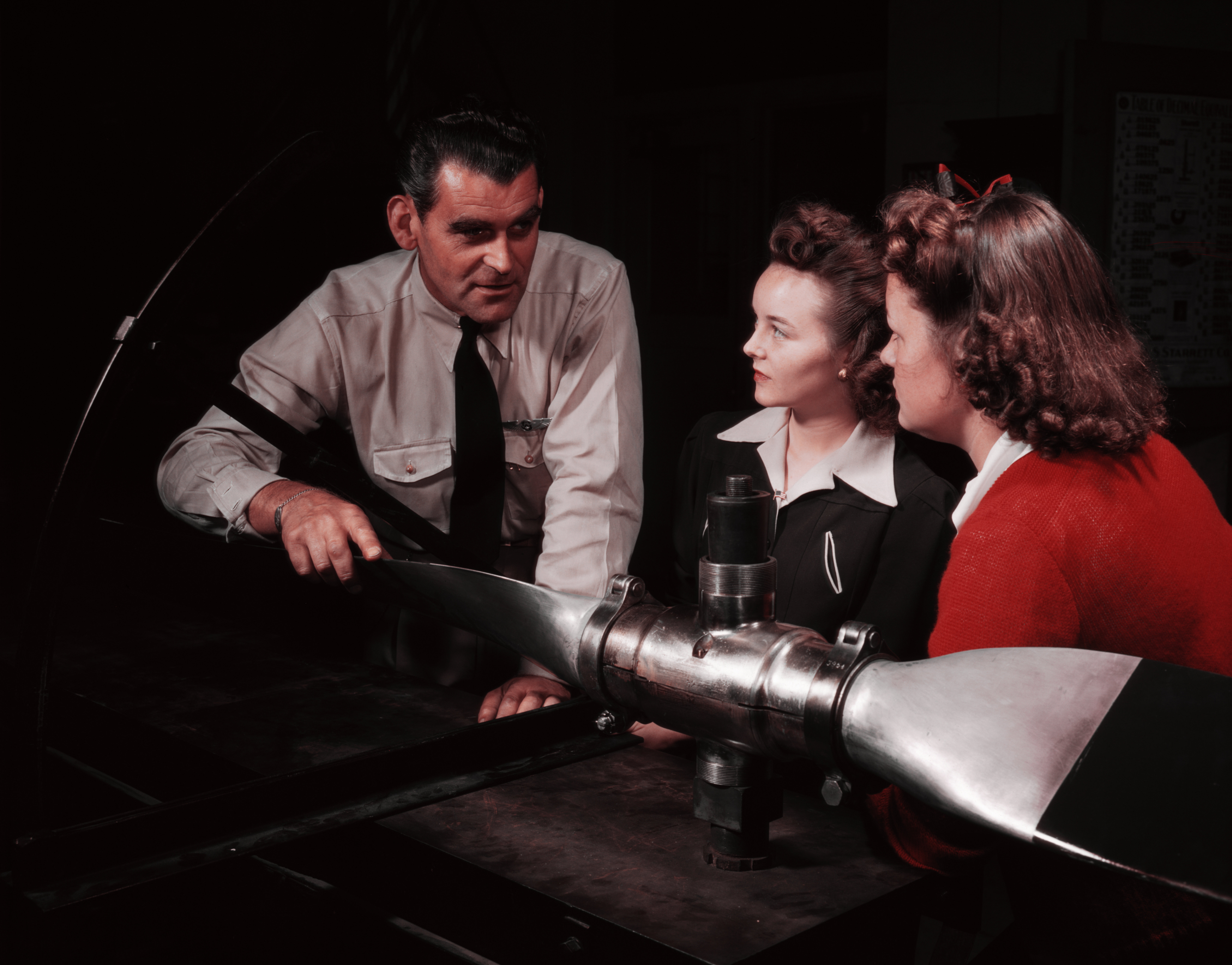
Students at Washington High School at class, training for specific contributions to the war effort, Los Angeles, Calif

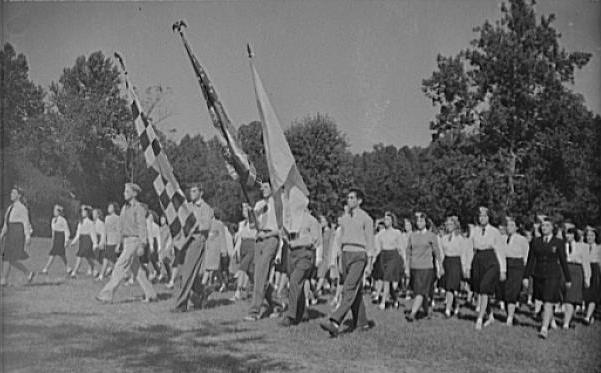
Victory Corps at Montgomery Blair HS

=== Collegiate band service organizations ===
The entrance of the United States into World War I (1917–1918) prompted the Wilson administration to promote a "patriotic mind-set." Community singing of patriotic songs such as "America" and "The Star Spangled Banner" were popular outlets for citizens as a way to promote "...strong community efforts of all kinds" and also assisted immigrants to learn English. In addition to community singing, concert bands and marching bands were also used to promote patriotism for "maintenance of civilian morale." College and university marching bands were also culturally influential during and after World War I, especially in the Midwest of the United States. Following the war, members of these collegiate bands were looking for ways to "develop good will, fellowship and understanding...and recognize the value of dedicated leadership." Two leading band service organizations were established to fit that calling, the Kappa Kappa Psi fraternity (ΚΚΨ) and the Tau Beta Sigma sorority (ΤΒΣ).

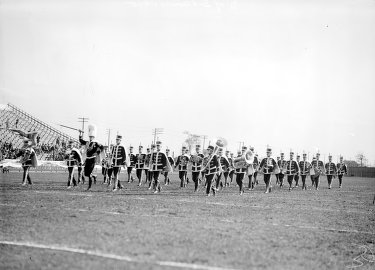
The University of Detroit Band at Dinan Field in the 1920s.

Kappa Kappa Psi was the first of those organizations, established on November 27, 1919, at Oklahoma A & M College. The strong sense of patriotism during World War I was wearing off in the U.S., and the band members of the university wanted to continue to advocate band music. Ten collegiate band members were selected including the band leader William A. Scroggs by the director of the ensemble, Bohumil "Boh" Makovsky. The fraternity quickly became national with the addition of the University of Washington and Montana State College in 1920. Since 1919, Kappa Kappa Psi members have been advocating, supporting and serving over 200 higher education institutions with around 5,000 active members each year. Famous fraternal brothers include John Philip Sousa, Karl King, and William Revelli.

There are currently five distinctive purposes for Kappa Kappa Psi today which include: (1) promoting the existence and welfare of secondary school bands and cultivate a respect for their endeavors, (2) honoring outstanding band members through fraternal membership, (3) stimulating campus leadership and respect through positive conduct, (4) fostering a positive bond among collegiate bands and a high level or performance achievement, and (5) providing a positive social experience to all involved in college bands or other musical organizations.

Collegiate bands in the 1920s were the domain of young men. Women were rarely involved, if at all. However, as the progressive movement of the U.S. was developing, bands became less militaristic and were accepting more women in the 1930s. Even with the progressive movement, some higher education bands held out much longer as a men-only ensemble. Michigan State University did not admit women into the Spartan Marching Band until 1972.

Tau Beta Sigma sorority was established on March 26, 1946, twenty seven years after Kappa Kappa Psi. The charter institution was Oklahoma State University, renamed from Oklahoma A & M, after the organization decided it would be easier to start in Oklahoma rather than Texas. A major circumstance for creating a band service organization for women was simply due to the fact that more women were now involved with university bands in the United States. Wava Banes along with some other women classmates at Texas Tech University approached their director, D. O. Wiley about forming a "group of bandswomen" in 1937. The local organization was formalized as Tau Beta Sigma and structured after the Kappa Kappa Psi fraternity.

Tau Beta Sigma petitioned Kappa Kappa Psi to become a chapter under their national fraternity in 1943, however a complete constitution re-write and difficulties associated with the U.S. entrance in World War II led Kappa Kappa Psi to suggest that Tau Beta Sigma form their own organization just as they had done in 1919. Due to complications with Texas corporation laws of 1945, A. Frank Martin from Kappa Kappa Psi suggested using a similar women's group at Oklahoma State University (OSU) as the founding chapter for Tau Beta Sigma. One month after OSU's charter was granted, the women traveled back to Texas to install the founding women of Tau Beta Sigma. Kappa Kappa Psi was able to convene in 1947 and officially accepted Tau Beta Sigma as their sister sorority.

Both organizations grew in the post-World War II era. Society was still evolving and changing and women's rights became front and center in 1972 with the passage of the Title IX law. This law "requires gender equity for boys and girls in every educational program that receives federal funding." Since both groups were federally funded, women were allowed to join Kappa Kappa Psi and men were allowed to join Tau Beta Sigma. Kappa Kappa Psi and Tau Beta Sigma are still active today and strive to promote the bands they are associated with as their founders did over a half century ago.

== Modern secondary education ==
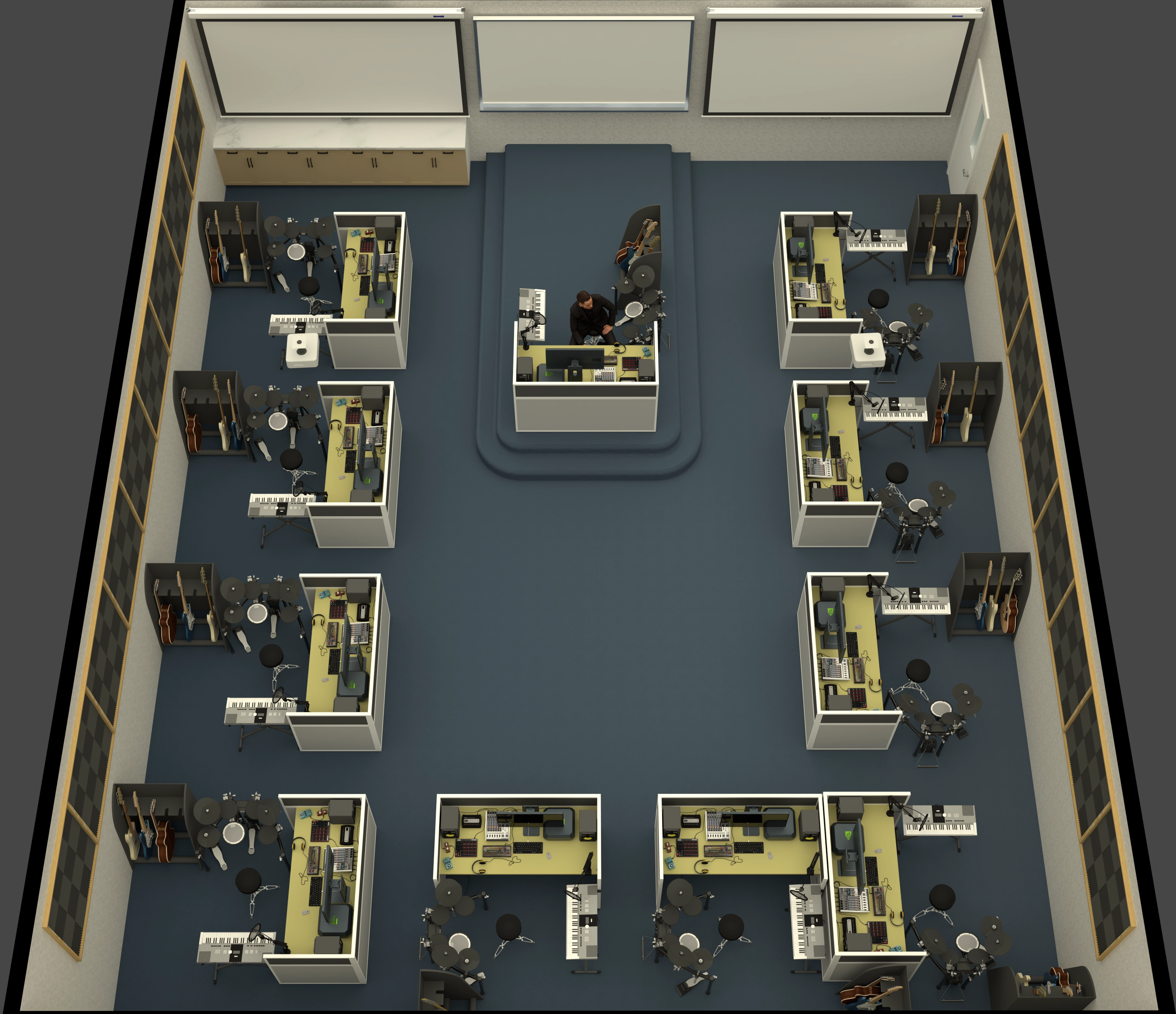
3D model of a digital audio workstation classroom

Music is generally optional in high school in the United States, and may or may not be required in middle or junior high school. Many music programs offer multiple opportunities for instrumentalists including concert bands, marching bands, jazz bands, and small ensembles. In addition, many high schools are expanding their music programs to include popular music genres. For example, the Music Makes Us (MMU) program launched in 2012 by Metropolitan Nashville Public Schools expanded the range of music ensembles offered in the district's high school programs to include genres like hip hop, rock, bluegrass and country. Other musical opportunities in most middle and high schools are choir and theater performance. Some high schools are starting to add music theory and conducting classes. These classes may be offered for dual credit in the future.

=== Music education reform ===
In 2015 a study was released from 2010 showing that according to the U.S. Department of Education, 40 percent of high schools do not require coursework in the arts for graduation. More than 8,000 public schools in the US are currently without music programs as of 2010. Across the country, 1.3 million elementary school students do not have access to a music class.

== Music as a core subject ==
=== History ===
According to the US Department of Education, the core academic subjects studied in schools are currently English, reading or language arts, mathematics, science, foreign languages, civics and government, economics, arts, history, and geography. In order to teach a core subject in the United States, one must be a Highly Qualified Teacher (HQT), meaning they must have a bachelor's degree from a four-year institution, be licensed in the state in which they wish to teach, and be fully competent in their subject area. However, individual competencies vary from state-to-state. Historically, music and fine arts had not been a part of core curriculum in schools in the United States, however, in July 2015, the United States Senate, passed a bipartisan revision naming music and art core subjects in curriculum under the Every Child Achieves Act.

The core subjects that were added were "technology, engineering, computer science, music, and physical education." This was an action against the No Child Left Behind Act, which many United States Education Advocates felt had narrowed down the subjects incorporated into the core curriculum. The No Child Left Behind Act was initially entitled the Elementary and Secondary Education Act of 1965, but then was later renamed No Child Left Behind in 2002. The National Association for Music Education, or NAfME, is an "organization of American music educators dedicated to advancing and preserving music education and as part of the core curriculum of schools in the United States." NAfME is an organization founded in 1907 of more than 60,000 people who advocate for the benefits of music and arts education for students at the local, state, and national levels. NAfME published a press release with the bipartisan senate revision and the impact they believe it will have on the United States Core Curriculum.

=== Implementation ===
Music is implemented as an academic subject in schools around the world, in places such as Greece, Germany, Slovenia, Spain, India, and Africa. This is not a comprehensive, as music is considered a cultural necessity in many countries worldwide. Although NAfME addresses the plan for implementation for music and arts as core subjects at the national level, the fulfillment of this revision of the Every Child Achieves Act varies from state to state. As of 2014, forty-one states currently have an arts education requirement at all levels, but only seventeen of these states have programs with deliberate assessment policies. Twenty-seven of the fifty United States consider the arts a core subject. Georgia and Arkansas have very specific outlines of music, while Alaska, Colorado, Hawaii, Michigan, and D.C. have no arts instruction requirements for any level of schooling.

The National Coalition for Core Arts Standards (NCCAS), has a series of performance assessments entitled Model Cornerstone Assessments, or MCAs, which have been expended in high schools as a pilot program in recent months. In addition to this, NAfME also has nine National Music Education standards, which include: "singing, alone and with others, a varied repertoire of music; performing on instruments, alone and with others, a varied repertoire of music; improvising melodies, variations, and accompaniments; composing and arranging music within specified guidelines; reading and notating music; listening to, analyzing, and describing music; evaluating music and music performances; understanding relationships between music, the other arts, and disciplines outside the arts; and understanding music in relation to history and culture."

=== Impacts on childhood development and academic success ===
Many policymakers and initiators for music and the arts as a part of the core curriculum believe that students participating in music and arts programs which hold them to high standards will bring a creative outlook now seemingly required in the workforce. Since music has traditionally been viewed as a subject outside of academia, and music has been incorporated into schools as a secondary subject, or often as an elective, there is limited research on classroom benefits of music as a core subject. Many researchers have explored both the benefits to listening to music passively as well as pursuing music actively, as with learning an instrument. The benefits music in the classroom and its effects on brain development, academic performance, and practical life skills have been observed through research by Jenny Nam Yoon. She concluded that the two hemispheres of the brain are stimulated when music is played and how the corpus callosum, the bridge that connects the two hemispheres is larger in musician's brains.

The effects of strictly listening to music have long been explored and has been given the name the "Mozart Effect", which is known to cause a "small increase in spatial-temporal reasoning". As seen with the Mozart Effect, listening to music has been proven to affect the brain and mood, as well as spatial temporal reasoning, but does not have any long-term benefits. A 1981 study at Mission Vejo High School proved that music students had a higher GPA than students who did not participate in music (3.59 vs. 2.91). There have been studies done verifying music as an enrichment activity that causes an increase in self-confidence, discipline, and social cohesion, as well as academic benefits. 7

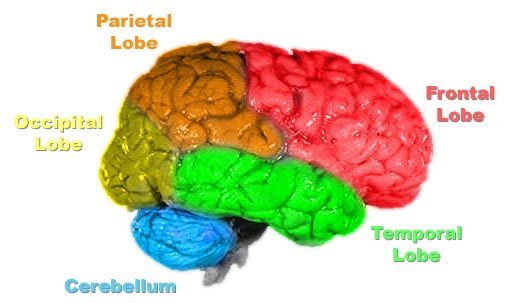
Music most often effects the lower parts of the frontal lobe.

Analyzing the interaction between music and the brain helps in understanding how and why music education affects students the way that it does. Music has the ability to engage the entire brain, which is unlike any other method of education. Scripp and Gilbert, who have analyzed these effects, also make note of the fact that musical training helps in the development of the brain physically and cognitively. It is also mentioned that the human brain is predisposed to musical development, meaning that music is rooted in our auditory, motor, and cognitive functions and plays a large role in the way we as individuals perceive the world around us. Scripp and Gilbert use evidence from ultrasound images of fetal tissue to draw the conclusion that there are "selective responses" to certain songs even before birth. Additionally, musical training seems to affect the brain just as exercise affects the body. For example, someone with musical training will have a more developed sense of auditory processing than someone who is not musically trained.

=== Critiques ===
Although the US Senate has endorsed music as a core subject, many, including Secretary of Education Lamar Alexander, argue music and the arts to be extra-curricular. Many also believe that among Federal budget cuts, music and the arts would be the first to go because they are not part of our foundation of core curriculum in America. The benefits of music as a core subject and its impact on the education system through the arithmetic, language, concentration, and other skills involved still have to be assessed before conclusions can be drawn about the concrete, measurable impacts music and the arts have on children in the United States public school system.

== Views on funding music education ==
The funding of music education has been debated in the United States due to budget cuts to music programs and varying beliefs on learning priorities in public schools.

Proponents of increasing federal funds for music education have argued that music provides children with cognitive and emotional benefits, such as improving spatial and temporal brain functions, which may help them succeed in other school subjects. Socially, advocates describe music as something that provokes peace, passion, and reduces stress, which they feel provides multiple benefits to students. Opponents of increasing federal funding believe that music is not important enough to warrant federal financial support, as they view it as a waste of tax dollars. Some assert that music programs distract students from gaining practical skills and takes money away from more useful areas, where funds could be more wisely spent. Others argue that the research showing cognitive or academic benefits stemming from music is unproven and needs to be further investigated before reaching a conclusion.

== Modern elementary education ==
Elementary schools in the United States typically offer music classes several times a week, with classes ranging from thirty to forty-five minutes in length. Beginning in about fourth grade, performance opportunities are often provided in the form of choirs or orchestral (especially wind) bands. There are several developed teaching methods intended for use in elementary schools. The Kodály Method was developed in Hungary by Zoltán Kodály. The Orff-Schulwerk Method was developed by Carl Orff, the German composer who wrote Carmina Burana. The Dalcroze-Eurythmics Method was developed in Switzerland by Emile Jaques-Dalcroze, who was teaching at the Geneva Conservatory at the time. All three methods place an emphasis on activity and learning by doing. The Kodály Method is known best for its use of solfege syllables and corresponding hand signals. The Orff-Schulwerk Method is most famous for its use of varying sizes of xylophones and glockenspiels, known as "Orff instruments." The Dalcroze-Eurythmics Method's most visible characteristic is its use of movement to music, ideally live music.

In a report by the Organization for Economic Cooperation and Education, OECD, it is explained that the time students typically spend in school during primary and lower secondary levels is 7,751 hours—of which, the schools surveyed for the report spent 11 percent of the time on the arts in elementary schools, and only eight percent of the time on the arts in lower secondary schools. This report also explains that the arts classes combined receive almost the same amount of time as physical education classes do, which is between eight and nine percent for both levels of schooling. ("How")

The United States Department of Education conducted a survey of 1,201 secondary schools during the 2009–2010 school year. This survey reported that the majority of secondary teachers teaching the different arts classes were specialists in their field (Basmat Parsad). In a secondary investigation, the United States Department of Education concluded that 94 percent of elementary schools offered instruction in music, and 83 percent of schools offered instruction in the visual arts in elementary schools during the same time period. Drama and dance classes were offered to only three and four percent of the elementary schools involved in the study, but more than half of the schools incorporated dance into other subjects (Parsad). Art and music classes were offered to elementary students at least once per week, Parsad explains.

The University of Connecticut implements various music programs that include general education as well as more focused studies.

== Music Programs at the Collegiate Level ==
With the success of the implementation of music education across the United States, this method of teaching began to advance into the collegiate level. For example, the University of Connecticut offers intensive programs to prepare students for careers in the field of music. Other courses are also offered for students who are interested in obtaining a general education regarding music and its components yet not looking to pursue a career in music, as is implemented in many colleges and universities.

At the University of Connecticut located in Storrs, Connecticut, the university offers a ‘Popular Music and Diversity in American Society’ class which serves as an introductory course to "popular music and diversity in America". This particular course focuses on these objectives by observing the musical implications of genres such as jazz, blues, and hip-hop, and how it relates to racial and class issues. Another course entitled "Music Fundamentals and Ear Training" in which students are able to develop skills such as note reading, pitch symbols, rhythm, and other musical concepts. These courses, amongst many others, enable attendees of the university to gain a general music education.

Ning Xu conducted a study amongst university students in which she tested for competency from multiple dimensions including "moral quality, humanistic quality, mental health, intelligence development and innovation ability". Her conclusion for this study supported the hypothesis that music education plays an important, positive role in regards to the competency of university students.

== Introduction of technology ==
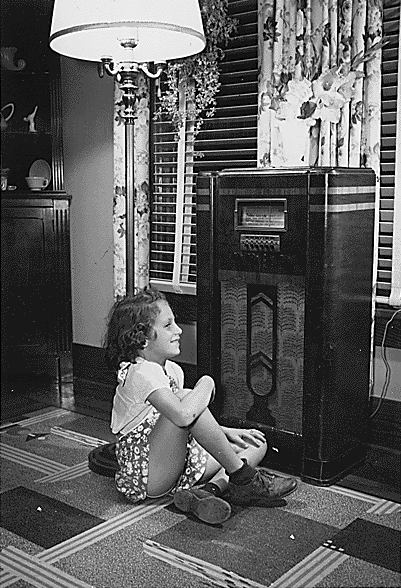
Girl listening to radio in late 1930s

Throughout the history of music education, many music educators have adopted and implemented technology in the classroom. Alice Keith and D.C. Boyle were said to be the first music educators in the United States to use the radio for teaching music. Keith wrote Listening in on the Masters, which was a broadcast music appreciation course. Another advocate who promoted the use of technology was Marguerite V. Hood, who was born on March 14, 1903, in Drayton, North Dakota. Hood graduated high school early, at the age of sixteen. She then attended Jamestown College, in Jamestown, North Dakota where she graduated with degrees in romance languages and music, and minors in history and English.

Hood's professional career led her to Montana in 1923, where she pursued teaching, writing, and public speaking. In 1930, Hood became Montana's second state music supervisor. During Hood's teaching career, the radio was used as an educational tool. Montana received poor radio reception because of the mountain interference, so Hood created local radio station broadcasts. Hood began the music education radio broadcast project, Montana School of the Air, in 1937. These broadcasts aired weekly on four radio stations. Using the radio for educational broadcasts received positive reviews because it allowed students to be reached all over the United States during the unstable time of the Great Depression. Radios were cost effective and could reach isolated, rural schools.

The National Broadcasting Company (NBC) played a major role in music education. NBC would broadcast musical examples for students enrolled in public school. Walter Damrosch directed the radio program, Music Appreciation Hour. In the course of this broadcast, teachers were able to obtain the musical selections in advance along with student notebooks and teacher instruction manuals. Two other popular music broadcast programs were Alice in Orchestralia and the Standard Symphony Hour. These broadcasts were an innovative teaching strategy which promoted and encouraged active listening and music appreciation. Prior to the radio, listening to music was limited to live performances and the skill of the teacher to play music, specifically on the piano.

The impact of the radio in the 1930s can similarly be compared to some of today's technology, such as iPods, compact discs, and computers. Technology has become much more widely available in the classroom since the 1930s. Today, children have access to many musical devices and options that were not available in the 1930s. In essence, technology has been used in music classrooms throughout the United States with the intent to improve the quality of music education for students.

== Continued research and development ==
As the medium of music technology continues to thrive, researchers have found that new developments in Extended Reality (XR) technology (such as augmented and virtual reality) can have direct implications in translating movement into a recorded piece of music. Thomas Deacon, Nick Bryan-Kinns, Patrick G.T. Healey, and Mathieu Barthet of the Queen Mary University of London performed an observational study of collaborative spatial music composition uncovering the practical methods of two experienced music producers to coordinate their understanding of multi-modal and spatial representations of music as part of their workflow. Through their analysis, the team suggested that gesture is used to understand, communicate and form action through a process of shaping sounds in space. This metaphor highlights how aesthetic assessments are collaboratively produced and developed through coordinated spatial activity. The implications establish sensitivity to embodied action in the development of collaborative workspaces for creative, spatial-media production of music.
