= François-Joseph Double =

French physician

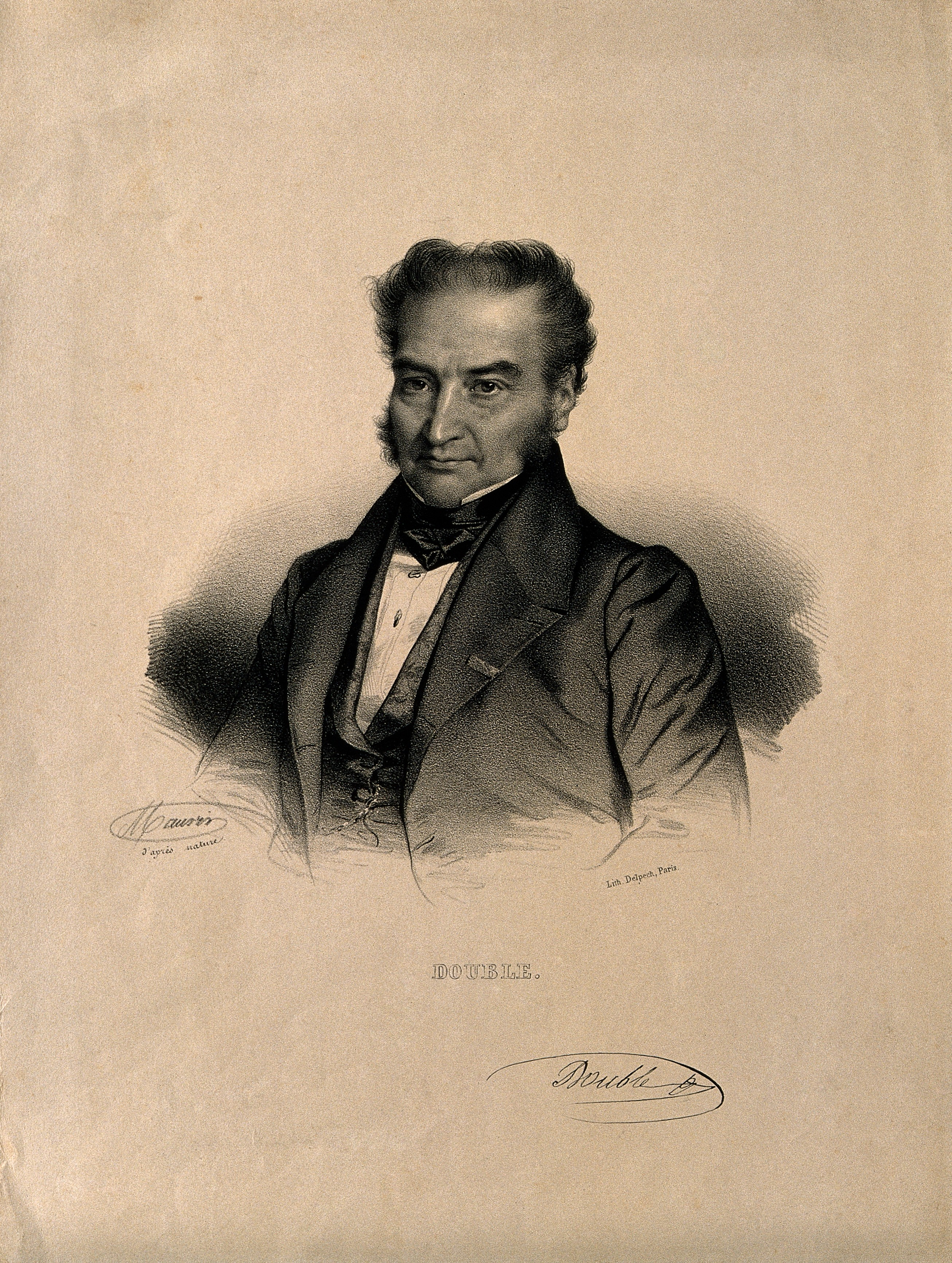
- Born: 11 March 1776; Verdun-sur-Garonne, Tarn-et-Garonne, France
- Died: 12 June 1842 (aged 66); Paris, France
- Resting place: Père Lachaise Cemetery
- Occupation: Physician

François-Joseph Double (1776–1842) was a French physician and co-founder of the Académie Nationale de Médecine.

== Biography ==
=== Early life ===
He was born on 11 March 1776 in Verdun-sur-Garonne, Tarn-et-Garonne, France. His family, the Double family, had been ennobled in 1378. His grandfather and father were both Apothecaries. He studied in Montpellier, where he was taught in Latin. He moved to Paris in 1803.

=== Career ===
He started his career as an apothecary in Paris. He served as a physician in the French-Spanish War of 1793.

As a physician, he developed the accurate observation of the clinical signs of illness, and studied the unaided auscultation of respiratory and cardiac ailments. He also described tubal breathing and pulmonary rales or crackles. He listened to the heart and focused on problems of the heartbeat and unusual sounds, but he failed to link them to any specific ailment. Shortly after, René Laennec (1781-1826) invented the stethoscope and developed aided auscultation. He wrote two books and many reports, for example about diseases like croup and cholera.

In 1832 he co-founded the Académie Nationale de Médecine with Antoine Portal (1742-1832). King Louis Philippe I (1773-1850), who reigned from 1830 to 1848, offered him another peerage should he renounce his medical practise, but he refused.

=== Death ===
He died on 12 June 1842 in Paris, and was buried in the Père Lachaise Cemetery in Paris.

== Legacy ==
His family owns the winery Château de Beaupré in Saint-Cannat, started in 1890 by Baron Emile Double (1869-1938).

== Bibliography ==
=== Primary sources ===
- Traité du croup (1811).
- Séméiologie générale ou traité des signes et de leur valeur dans les maladies (3 volumes, Paris, Croullebois).

=== Secondary sources ===
- Michel Suspène, Docteur François-Joseph Double, un itinéraire médical, en hommage à l'Académie de médecine (CDDP de Tarn-et-Garonne, Montauban, 2002).
