= Lambesc =

Commune in Provence-Alpes-Côte d'Azur, France

- Commune
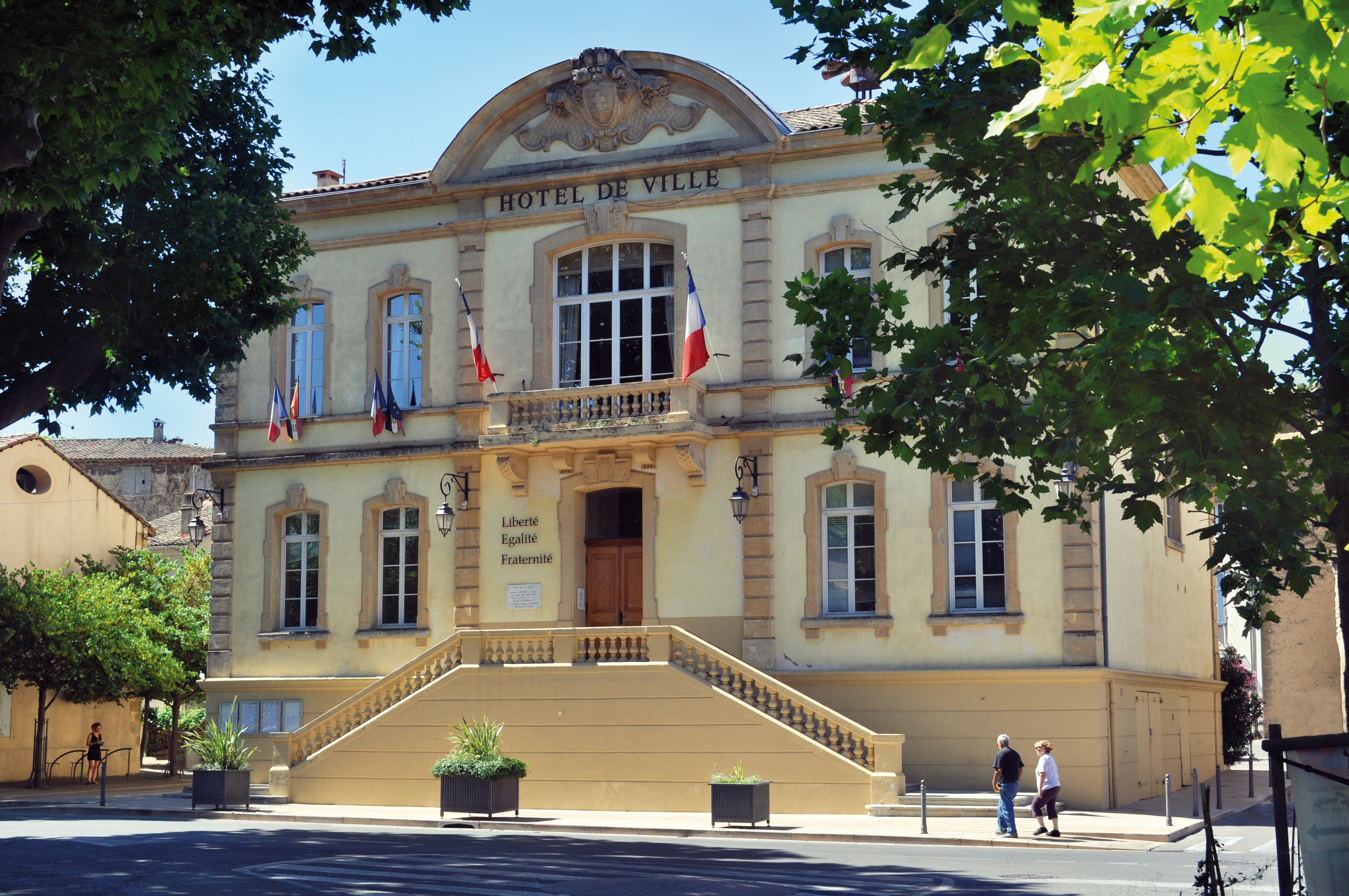
- Lambesc Town Hall

- Coat of arms
- Location of Lambesc
- Location within France Location within Provence-Alpes-Côte d'Azur
- Coordinates: 43°39′17″N 5°15′45″E
- Country: France
- Region: Provence-Alpes-Côte d'Azur
- Department: Bouches-du-Rhône
- Arrondissement: Aix-en-Provence
- Canton: Pélissanne
- Intercommunality: Aix-Marseille-Provence

Government
  - Mayor (2026–32): Philippe Razeyre
- Area^{1}: 65.34 km^{2} (25.23 sq mi)
- Elevation: 204 m (669 ft)
- Highest elevation: 482 m (1,581 ft)
- Lowest elevation: 111 m (364 ft)
- Population (2023): 10,024
  - Density: 153.4/km^{2} (397.3/sq mi)
- Time zone: UTC+01:00 (CET)
  - Summer (DST): UTC+02:00 (CEST)
- INSEE/Postal code: 13050 /13410
- ^{1} French Land Register data, which excludes lakes, ponds, glaciers > 1 km^{2} (0.386 sq mi or 247 acres) and river estuaries.

Lambesc (French pronunciation: [lɑ̃bɛsk]) is a commune in the Bouches-du-Rhône department in the Provence-Alpes-Côte d'Azur region in southern France.

Lambesc is located in the heart of Provence at the foot of the Côtes mountain range, near the Alpilles. The town has a strong historical and cultural heritage, being home to the Church of Our Lady of the Assumption, the 11th-century Romanesque chapel of St. Anne's Goiron, as well as Manivert, a local art and archaeological museum. The town's special character and its beautiful environs, including the Luberon massif, attracts international tourism to the area.

== Geography ==
Lambesc is located on a hillside in the Massif de la Trévaresse, 1.5 km from the Canal de Marseille. It is 20 km from Aix-en-Provence and Gare d'Aix-en-Provence TGV, 15 km from Salon de Provence, 30 km from Marignane and the Marseille Provence Airport, and 60 km from Avignon

== History ==
=== Neolithic ===
To the west of Lambesc, within 500 metres north of the old riverbed of "The Concernade", a small Neolithic settlement with evidence of post holes was discovered during the work of LGV Méditerranée. Another settlement was discovered in 1995 in a nearby valley. Traces of occupation (homes, septic, lithic material) from the Neolithic to the Bronze Age have been found. The site was reoccupied until the Bronze Age IIIb (as evidenced by funerary structure type mounds, a mold foundry, and a small dwelling) before being finally abandoned in the Iron Age.

=== Early history ===
Lambesc has evidence of a Celtic-Ligurian settlement (Saluvii) Salyens and of the Tritolii, tribes which have left a multitude of sites (oppidum establishment of plains, places of worship etc.). There is also evidence of many trade partners, including the Etruscans, the Greeks of Massilia in particular, the other tribes of the federation Salyens or even of Liguria and Rome. Archaeologists have found that Lambesc was already occupied in the Bronze Age and Iron Age. There are also many hill forts and open institutions, which show the diversity of cultivated soils and development of metallurgical activities. They have also founded a market which took the name "Oppidum Amboliacense", which came to supply the Greek Massilia (1st and 2nd century BC).

However, the perennial animosity, and a few violent conflicts between the Greeks of Marseilles and its hinterland natives led to the call from Marseilles for Roman intervention against the aboriginals. In 124 BC, Romans of Flaccus Flaccus occupied the whole territory, including the province of Gaul Narbonne. What remained of the army of Salyens Toutomotulus, its king and its leaders, fled and found refuge with the Savoyards. The last Salyens revolt in the region was in 90 BC.

=== Gallo-Roman history ===
After the peace, Rome distributed lands and settlements to the veterans of the legions for use with the Salyens who survived the war. They founded an establishment vicus, on the site of a temple to Mercury. It remains as "Saint-Estève", the remains of a Gallo-Roman rural settlement as well as another institution, organised and based on the farm in Grand Verger. The latter is divided into a pars urbana, a go fructuria. This site has been occupied since the 1st century AD. There are agricultural settlements, villas, and cemeteries, and the site index includes deposits of amphorae, dolia, and ceramics.

We know from the Gallo-Roman population of Lambesc that they revered a local water deity, near an ancient spring, where three dedications to Iboïte were found. One of them is that of an M (...) Amoena, freed man of Pompeii. Another from Sextus Pompeius Theophilus, a prepaid' Proculus, and the last of Decimus Ratius Bassus, prepaid Decimus.

An inscription was found, to the god Mercury, on an altar of limestone to the east of the town. In the same area, a dedication to the tutelary deities was discovered: "Sextus has fulfilled his vow against Suleviae willingly and rightfully".

=== Middle Ages ===
In the Middle Ages, in the valley of the Concernade, the small town of Lambesc was built on a rocky headland, now 'Church Square'. Previously the local 'castrum', or fort, sat on this promontory.

Local toponymy suggests the "neighbourhood villains" lived there, which was the poorest part of the Lambesc castrum. It was on this hill (the church square, Place Jean Jaurès, place du Castel). Towards the end of 15C and early 16C, as the first suburbs were created outside the old city walls, inns and other taverns developed.

East of Lambesc, in the district of Saint-Peyre, remains Podium Amboliacense, the ruins of a medieval chapel. The chapel of St. Peter was built on the ruins of the temple of Mercury in 810, by Eldrad son of Ardrad, the first Lord Lambesc. San-Peyre was sacked by Ramon Berenguer IV in 1222.

In the 12th century, the Abbey of Saint-André of Villeneuve-les-Avignon owned the church of St. John in the valley Valbonette, which enabled it to raise revenues. This church-priory was sold to the Abbey Silvacane at the end of the twelfth century.

In 1358, the lords of Lambesc Philippe and Pierre d'Alamanon, followed by the lords of La Roque-d'Anthéron, plundered the Silvacane Abbey.

The castle that remains today is a 9th-century tower, inside the Church of Our Lady of the Assumption (1700–1741). This church succeeded Notre-Dame-de-la-Rose (13th-century). The nave of Our Lady of Hope of the Cathedral of Saint-Sauveur in Aix-en-Provence was the work of Jean Vallon, author, with his brother Lawrence.

Barony and the Principality as Louis XIV, the city became famous playing a political role in the history of Provence, which earned him the nickname" Versailles Aix."

Until the 18th century many nobles, from noble families of Provence, ruled Lambesc.

=== 16th to 18th centuries ===
In 1453 and in 1688, the barony Lambesc belonged to the House of Guise (branch of the House of Lorraine). Mary of Lorraine bequeathed it on 6 February 1686, to Mr. Armagnac, Grand Equerry of France.

The barony included several hamlets (The Chapusse La Tour-de-Janet, Janet, Douau, Upper Libran, La Font-d'Arles, The Coussou, The Fedon, Sues and Garandeau) that constitute its fiefs.

In 1589, Valletta laid siege to the city. After 300 guns given, the garrison under Esmenard of Vautubière capitulated. The latter and eleven of his men were hanged on the spot, thus paying the price for their loyalty to their lord the Duke of Guise. Lambesc, bastion of the ultra-Catholic cause, was occupied for several days by the royal troops of Henri III.

In May 1590, in the urgency of an outbreak of child fever, a hospital was established in the Fédons. The latter was used for only three to four months, and was forgotten until discovered by the preliminary works for the LGV Méditerranée during spring 1996.

Under the reigns of Louis XIV, Louis XV, and Louis XVI, Lambesc played an important political role in the history of Provence. For a hundred years, 1646 to 1786, the General Assemblies of communities in the country of Provence sat there, which earned the city the name "Versailles Aachen". There are still some very beautiful mansions around the city. (Hotel de Cadenet Charleval, Laura of Pagy Valbonne, Faudran of Laval, and Saint Chamas).

Lambesc became a principality in 1688 and remained in the hands of the family of Lorraine de Brionne (1688–1789) until 1789, the year of the French Revolution (then Charles Eugene, Prince of Lambesc).

The outbreak of fever, which broke out in Marseille in 1720, terrorised the whole of Provence. Men were conscious of their impotence before it but took drastic measures to protect themselves. Lambesc's population was marked for more than a year as evidenced by the many deliberations between 2 August 1720 and 17 August 1721. Preventive measures were taken against the scourge:

a ban on trade with foreigners, the need to erect fences and barricades to confine the city and suburbs, eviction of a family of 15 in Marseille, designation of a road to allow free movement for foreigners to avoid their contact with Lambescains, construction of walls with lime and sand [...] more than 40 men under the command of the Marquis de La Barben, to purchase 80 pounds of drugs and medicines, fines given to anyone who opens the doors and windows closed, [...] foreign provision of a line of six soldiers in the direction of Saint-Cannat, another line towards Taillades and another towards the path of Berre, security provided by the bourgeois guard.

=== French Revolution ===
On 25 March 1789, a meeting of the people of Lambesc was called by the consuls and his council, at the Hotel du Janet, to prepare a list of grievances. Of the 790 heads of families called, 725 move and are quoted on the record. On 2 April Lambesc also elected eight delegates to represent the community in the drafting of a "provincial register of grievances."

On 14 February 1790, the municipality was renewed but Lambesc was divided into two assemblies (royalists and revolutionaries); one met in the church of the Trinitarians and the other in the chapel of Bourras, where a few years earlier the general meetings of communities in the country of Provence were held. The Chairman of the National Assembly did not hesitate on 13 June 1790 to send support to the mayor and municipal officers of the city, and expressed the satisfaction of the National Assembly on the wise and measured steps they had taken "despite the turmoil that erupted in the city due to the resistance of the Royal Navy Regiment (aside from Marseille) against the new authority in place".

The same year Lambesc became the county seat of the Canton.

In 1793, a counter-revolutionary movement was led by the vicar Lambesc Angelier, who was later guillotined with other friends in Marseille. This period of unrest between Federated and Republicans, led to sacking of the convent by the revolutionaries. Federalists do not the Republicans before General Carteaux. It was during these fierce battles that Theresa Figueur (AliasMadame Sans-Gene), acting as a gunner, was arrested in Marseilles and taken prisoner to Lambesc. The girl soldier was faced with a simple alternative: enlist under the banner of the Republic or the guillotine. She chooses the first solution.

Illustrious guests stayed in Lambesc: In 1564, King Charles IX and Queen Catherine de' Medici, with the future King Henri III, and the Prince of Navarre, the future Henri IV. It is a stop on the Grand Tour of France made by early royal courts: in 1631 by Prince of Condé, in 1639 Prince Casimir of Poland, in 1657 Queen Christina of Sweden. Finally, Madame de Sévigné came several times to Lambesc to visit her daughter Franchise, wife of Count Grignan, lieutenant general of the king in Provence. Camille de Lorraine (1726–1788), brother of Charles Louis de Lorraine, the penultimate Prince of Lambesc, Marie de Lorraine (1671–1724), Princess of Monaco and her brother, Louis-Alphonse Ignatius (1675–1704) called the 'Bailiff of Lorraine "(1701) also visited.

=== Contemporary history ===
On 31 May 1807 Sues was attached to Lambesc.

On 4 March 1886, the last hermit and gatekeeper known as St. Anne Goiron Jean Cluny (1810–1886) died.

In the early 1900s, Lambesc had 2,352 residents, a stock market, factories for jams and preserves (the old cannery and Barbier Dauphin, located in the current market place, at the location of the current post since 1989), and oil mills. See History of the Post Office of Lambesc

The 6.2 Ms Provence earthquake destroyed many houses and left 46 people dead on 11 June 1909. The shock occurred on the Trévaresse Fault and had a maximum Mercalli intensity of X (Extreme). It affected Lambesc, Rognes, Saint-Cannat, Vernègues, and Pélissanne).

In 1944, resistance was organised throughout Lambesc, in the face of German occupation. The Resistance went into the hills on 5 June 1944, on the plateau and that of Manivert Seze. As a result of intense clashes on 12 June 1944, many guerrillas were arrested or shot on the spot after a few days, and then shot at various locations in the township. Monuments are found at various places in Lambesc, honouring the martyrs killed by Nazi bullets.

22% of Lambesc was affected by the explosion of a German munitions train, parked at the station, which destroyed many houses. Lambesc was cited in the order of the division, with the award of the Croix de guerre 1939–1945 on 11 November 1948.

== Toponymy ==
In 814 AD the city was designated for the first time under the name Lambisco villa. The Ligurian suffix -iscum and could be Latin pre-fix 'lamb' (mountain) became Lambisco (in 965-977), and finally took the form 'Lambescho' around 1200 AD.

The peculiarity of its name is that "Lambesc" has always been spelled out in the Occitan language Provence, although Arnaud d'Agnel gallicised it as the "Lambs" in 1477.

The residents are called Lambescain(s).

== Demographics ==
Historical population

Year	Pop.	±% p.a.
1793	3,636	—
1800	4,060	+1.59%
1806	3,800	−1.10%
1821	3,830	+0.05%
1831	3,898	+0.18%
1836	3,810	−0.46%
1841	3,587	−1.20%
1846	4,118	+2.80%
1851	3,747	−1.87%
1856	3,425	−1.78%
1861	3,330	−0.56%
1866	3,340	+0.06%
1872	3,038	−1.57%
1876	2,829	−1.77%
1881	2,765	−0.46%
1886	2,740	−0.18%
1891	2,410	−2.53%
1896	2,352	−0.49%
1901	2,630	+2.26%

Year	Pop.	±% p.a.
1906	2,369	−2.07%
1911	2,432	+0.53%
1921	2,022	−1.83%
1926	2,010	−0.12%
1931	1,992	−0.18%
1936	1,961	−0.31%
1946	1,967	+0.03%
1954	2,109	+0.88%
1962	2,560	+2.45%
1968	2,822	+1.64%
1975	3,588	+3.49%
1982	5,353	+5.88%
1990	6,698	+2.84%
1999	7,604	+1.42%
2007	8,445	+1.32%
2012	9,261	+1.86%
2017	9,672	+0.87%
2023	10,024	+0.60%

Source: EHESS and INSEE (1968-2023)

== Access and transport ==
Lambesc can be accessed by car on Route nationale 7; its position places the town at the crossroads of the principle tourist attractions in the Provence.

One can get to Lambesc from Paris, the east, the north, and the west by high-speed rail, stopping at Gare d'Aix-en-Provence TGV, and then taking a shuttle bus. One can also take a Corail rail car on the Transport express régional to Gare d'Aix-en-Provence.

To get to Lambesc from Marseille Provence Airport, the bus can be used, making a connection at either Aix-en-Provence or Salon-de-Provence. The route by taxi or Uber is approximately 20 km.

== Geology ==
To the north, the hills rise to 484 m, extending the Massif des Costes which lies to the west.

Further east are the limestone reliefs of the Alps of Provence. It is initiated by the valley of the Touloubre (Salon-de-Provence).

Around the village, the plains are fertile with irrigation and the many streams; wheat, the wine and olives are grown.

== Hydrology ==
Originally Lambesc was crossed by four rivers: the Lavaldenan, Estagnol, the Concernade and Touloubre, of which only the latter still retains a significant flow.

The catchment area of the village provides numerous springs, with various levels of dryness: the springs of Castle Calavon, Libran, Beauchamp, Toulouzan, Chapuis, the Font d'Arles, Viviers, Saint-Michel, Fontvive, Bois-Vert du Moulin Blanc, Suffren St., three in north-western Bonrecueil, Castle Calavon of Gréau and of Mondesir and southwest of the Castle Taillades.

== Seismicity ==
Following the decree of 14 May 1991, defining the seismic zoning map of France, Bouches-du-Rhône was cut up as follows:

- Zone II area that corresponds to a "seismic average": the townships of Lambesc, Peyrolles-en-Provence and Salon-de-Provence, all three of the Arrondissement of Aix-en-Provence
- Zone Ib, an area which corresponds to a "low seismicity" around the Canton of Aix-en-Provence and Trets of Arrondissement of Aix-en-Provence, the townships of Eyguières and Orgon of Arrondissement of Arles and the townships of Berre-l 'Etang, Istres North and Istres-Sud of Arrondissement Istres.
- Zone Ia, an area that corresponds to a "very low seismicity": all other townships of the Arrondissement of Aix-en-Provence, the cantons of Arles- is, Châteaurenard and Saint Remy-de-Provence of Arrondissement of Arles the townships Marignane, Martigues East and Martigues West of Arrondissement Istres, and finally township Roquevaire of Arrondissement of Marseille.
- Zone 0, which corresponds to a "negligible seismicity".

== Politics and administration ==
=== Administration before the Revolution ===
The land of Lambesc comprised no less than 22 portions. The management of the manor was mainly provided by the "vassals" of the Prince. The rest of Lambesc was regrouped into a "general council of the community", with a municipal system adopted since 1715.

Lambesc was originally a barony. At least it was for the Parliament of Provence which sat in Aix. The status of the Lord of Lambesc was a bone of contention with the French monarch, who considered it as an "autonomous principality in Western Provence" which he had created.

The board met once a week usually on Tuesdays. A General Assembly could be called in exceptional circumstances. The last time was on 25 March 1789, on the occasion of the convening of the States General. As head of the General Council of the Community, there was a first consul and two deputies (who were also consuls); they were elected from the General Council for a term of one year.

The First Consul took care of routine business. Counselors were co-opted annually and numbered fifteen individuals. Often ex-consuls and junior officers represented the board in their daily tasks. A master Registrar, a Chief Clerk and Recorder controlled elections, and the royal lawyer ratified them. The new directors were sworn in and were accepted or rejected by the magistrate of Lambesc. All were paid by the community.

In terms of justice, the Prince of Lambesc named a judge, who sat in his courtroom, the Hotel Du Janet. When his position was vacant, the Seneschal of Aix made all necessary arrangements, as was the case on 20 February 1781, when an inhabitant was "found dead, murdered" on 18 February 1781. The judge also had the power to prevent the holding of the general council of the community if a quorum was not reached. In this case, he ordered the requisition, by the consuls of the city, of several former advisors to achieve the quorum, and made them swear an oath before the opening of the council.

The armed wing of the local justice and Royal was represented by the Marshals. The latter had a brigade that consisted of six riders in 1779. The community council could also take some legal measures.

Lambesc depended, in terms of its finances, on the stewardship of the Viguerie and the revenues of Aix.

Revenues (despite the various taxes) were too little to bear the load on the community. Extraordinary expenses perpetually undermined the budget. The community council was constantly advancing étapiers money and lodging. The stewardship of Aix-en-Provence advanced this money from year to year. Finally, the community, since 1646, had been supporting housing for members during the General Assembly conventions in the country of Provence, which burdened finances a little more and were expensive for the city and the community Lambesc.

Free accommodation for MPs was necessarily at the expense of the community. But the level of comfort of guests, and the presence of powerful nobles of the Kingdom of France at such meetings required a sacrifice, tipping the small principality of Lambesc into inescapable debt. It was not until 1760 that the consuls of Lambesc obtained an annual allowance of 600 pounds, increased to 1,200 pounds in 1765, to help defray the costs generated by holding these meetings.

Formerly, inns and other lodging capacity were sufficient, but around the year 1770 the problem of housing rapidly became a concern. Many mattresses were provided at the meetings: 69 were provided in 1777, 99 in 1778. The final blow occurred on 23 November 1785. The Lambesc community council ratified the building of new rooms and new windows in the Hotel Du Janet. But Lambesc, already too much in debt, could not bear the construction costs for new housing. So in 1786, with the background of a "housing crisis", the holding of Lambesc meetings was removed to the city of Aix. The latter had adequate housing which was certainly cheaper.

But in December 1787, the community council asked the prince of Lambesc, Charles Eugène de Lorraine, to intervene to ensure the maintenance of general meetings of the province in Lambesc. A request that appears to have been immediately satisfied, since on 25 March 1788, the Lambesc community council registered the order of Monseigneur the Archbishop of Aix, who had asked the Lambesc community to build a row of homes (along the current National Boulevard). The work progressed, but the troubles which broke out in Provence in the aftermath of the French Revolution of 1789 did not allow Lambesc to continue as the "political capital" of Provence.

=== Administration and management ===
Mr. Rene Emera, a new director general of service created two new leadership positions: Directors of public procurement and purchasing, and of the legal department.

In 2008, the municipality of Lambesc won the regional 'Premio' competition, organised by 'Cape Energies' (a subsidiary of ÉDF) and became a pilot city in Sustainable Development.

In 2009, an extension of the Lambesc childcare centre was opened, managed by the Lambescaine association "Rural Families", in response to parental demand for continuous care for their children during their working day.

A new summer camp was inaugurated in the summer of 2009, managed by the Federation of Friends of Secular Education.

List of successive mayors
Term	Name
1965–1995	Gilbert Pauriol
1995–2008	Bernard Ramond
2008–2014	Jacques Bucki
2014–present	Bernard Ramond

== Economy ==
=== Economic history ===
Under the Ancien Régime, agriculture was characterised as mixed, with typically Mediterranean crops: cereals, oil and wine are mainly produced. In the late eighteenth century, wheat and oil were the basic products, but wheat became less and less important. Moreover, agronomists were suggesting Provençal olive farms and vineyards. Already in 1766, Abbot Expilly reflects this trend and says Lambesc is "in a country abounding in pleasant wine and olive oil." But there is also growing almonds, followed by fodder and a few mulberry.

Raising ovicapridés was known in Lambesc. Local toponymy has left us traces. The "coussous", meaning the patis (pastures, meadows) indicates a place only for flocks of sheep and goats. It is the same for "Fedon", a term that seems to have been adopted after 1500, because this area was formerly called "Farriol". The "Fedon (for fede: sheep), is a place name later, so that would mean the place where the sheep lie down. Other names evoke the road for the transhumant such as that of the 'track of Arles. "

Long before the Industrial Revolution, the local cadastral map near the Concernade records, around 1777, new land parcels reserved solely for spinning silk, a soap factory and one for dyeing cotton. Taillades was a soda factory, a product essential to the manufacture of soap. In 1787 Lambesc therefore had a soap factory, two boilers and two tile. It also identified seven oil mills and wheat mills along the Concernade at Bertoire and the Calvary. Until 1777, stone was quarried in "large areas", before the district of Peirière was preferred for reasons of cost by 1786 .

According to the Count de Villeneuve, three fairs were held at Lambesc, the main one, also cited by the Abbot Expilly, was that of 9 October, the feast of St. Denis, patron saint of the country.

As of 23 January 1763, markets were held at Lambesc each Tuesday as in the cities of Cadenet and Rians. This was decided in response to a request from Lambescains, presented to the Council of State on 17 July 1754. It had first established the day to be Wednesday, but the community council later ruled it should be Tuesday.

Lambesc, above all, was a stage coach town; that was the main reason for its houses and hostels. Twenty were identified between the sixteenth and eighteenth centuries. Now the only remaining inn has its original sign, the "Golden Arm." It was not until the arrival of the railroad in Provence, in the mid-nineteenth century that the major sectors of the local economy – based on transport – were shaken by this "revolution", leading in particular to the closure of homes and inns, and the exodus of its population.

=== Modern economy ===
The local economy is now focused on quarries, vineyards, olive trees, cereals, fruit and vegetable crops, wine making and the wines classified under the AOC as 'Coteaux d'Aix-en Provence', honey, olive oil and truffles. There is a fruit and vegetables cannery and several agricultural cooperatives (for olive oil, wine etc.).

== Education ==
=== Schools ===
- Elementary School 'Vincent Van Gogh'
- Elementary School 'Jeanne d'Arc' (private)
- Elementary school 'Jacques Prévert'
- College 'Jean Guehenno'
- MFR (Domaine Garachon).

== Denominations and religions ==
Lambesc has many churches due to its ultra-Catholic character during the Middle Ages. These include: the Parish of Three Stones, Catholic, the EPRE Protestant Community — Chapelle Saint-Roch

== Cultural facilities, events and festivities ==
Lambesc is located twenty minutes by car from Aix-en-Provence and Sainte-Victoire, 45 minutes from the Luberon (Gordes, Roussillon ...) and is close to Avignon, Marseille, the Mediterranean, the Camargue, the Alpes-de-Haute-Provence and Var.

A market is held on Friday mornings, a craft fair in mid-March; on the 3rd weekend of November there is a market for figurines, a local produce market in late November and a Fair for plants in mid-April. The Village Festival is on 16 September.

The city has cultural facilities for film, a sports complex, a pool, a theater, a library, and supports many sports and cultural activities, through an association. Tourist accommodation in Lambesc is varied: hotels, cottages, bed and breakfast and camping.

== Famous residents ==
- Charles Eugène de Lorraine, Prince of Lambesc and Grand Squire of France (1761–1789) was known, following the events of 1789, the slasher of Lambesc. He died childless in Vienna, 21 November 1825.
- Marie de Rabutin-Chantal, marquise de Sévigné (1626–1696). A famous letter writer who gave us 41 letters alluding to Lambesc; four were written in Lambesc during visits to her daughter, the Countess of Grignan (in 1672, 1690, 1695).
- Émile Zola (1840–1902), writer and author of Mysteries of Marseille (1867). In this novel, which is a replica of the mysteries of Paris, Zola portrays his hero in three cities including Marseille, Aix-en-Provence and Lambesc.
- Antoine Pagi (1624–1699) Author of Critique of the Annals of Baronius (1689–1705, 4 vols. folio), an Essay on the consulates of the Roman emperors and Dissertatio hypatica, seu consulibus of Caesareis, 1682, Lyon.
- Francis Pagi (1654–1721), friar, Franciscan, who was made 'provincial' three times. He is the author of Historical Breviarium criticum, Pontificum Romanorum illustrium gestation Conciliorum generalium acta, etc.., Complectens, 1717–1747, Antwerp (Geneva), 4 vols. in-4 °, and was responsible for even a continuatio historiography chronologicoe ab Alexandro XII usque ad Innocentium XII, 1694, Lyon, in-12.
- Leon Dury (1822–1891), medical doctor, diplomat and teacher, active in Japan between 1865 and 1877
- Joseph Toussaint Reinaud (1795–1867), famous Arabist. He held the chair of Arabic at the School of Modern Oriental Languages. He was also the author of a book on Muslim Archaeology. He was made an Officer of the Legion of Honour.

== Monuments and buildings ==
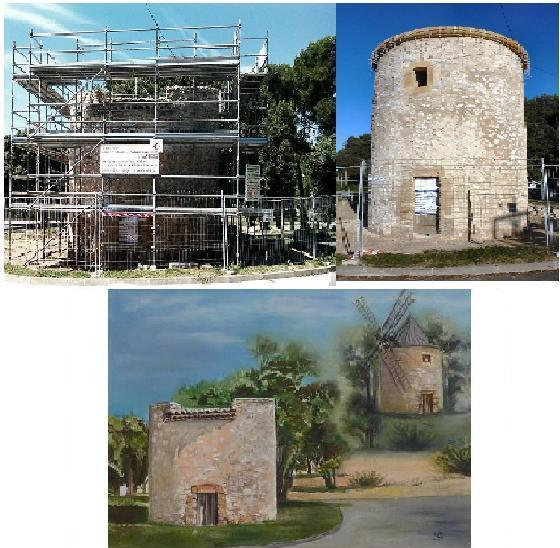
The Bertoire windmill (18thC) undergoing restoration

=== The Wind Mill Provençal (Moulin à vent Provençal) in the neighbourhood Bertoire ===
The tower mill of Bertoire (13410 – Lambesc) was built of local stone (between 1795 et 1810), with a vaulted ground floor to support the first floor and two rotating and recumbent wheels. It is located near the sports park, opposite the "Calypso" shopping centre. The "Conservation patrimoine de Lambesc" (CPL) Association was founded in October 2009, whose first project is to add sails to the mill and then to grind wheat; the tower will then become a windmill.

The City of Lambesc, owner of this windmill since 1981, authorised this project in November 2010, contracting with the CPL Association. Then, the CPL Association contracted, in December 2010, with the "Fondation du Patrimoine" (the heritage foundation in France), to launch a public appeal for funds, starting in January 2011. Soutien au Projet de restauration du Moulin de Bertoire

=== Modern period ===
Lambesc inherited seven monuments and many classified historic paintings (visible in the church).

Still to be seen are: the oratories of St. Roch (eighteenth-century), Sainte-Anne (1777) (listed as an historic monument), near the chapel Saint-Marc (1709) (IMH ), in a boundary wall of the castle Aiguebelle, Sainte-Thérèse (1629) (IMH), not far from the convent of the Blessed Sacrament, St. Suffren (1825), Notre-Dame-de-la-Rose (1680 ) of the Sacred Heart of Jesus Sacred Heart, Holy Cross, St. Catherine, St. Mary Mother of the Church, and Calvary, in the woods of Taillades.

=== Lambesc and the buildings of worship ===
Lambesc possess (or possessed) many buildings of worship: the Church of Our Lady of the Assumption (an eighteenth-century monument), replaced the old building (Notre-Dame-de-La-Rose from the 13th century). It keeps the 16th-century tower, with square battlements (from where an arrow was shot in 1909); the White Penitents chapel (seventeenth century, a former chapel of the Grey Penitents (1640), was razed in 1905; its St. Michael Chapel in the cemetery is an historical monument). The Chapelle Saint-Jacques Hospital (1860), Monastery of Trinitarian Fathers (1512), St. Therese Convent (1640) can also be found.

=== Outside Lambesc ===
Outside Lambesc, there is also the votive chapel of Saint-Roch (1634), rebuilt in the seventeenth and eighteenth centuries (IMH), the Sainte-Anne-de-Goiron (Romance), which belonged to the Abbey of Saint-Victor de Marseille until the early twelfth century, then to Saint-André of Villeneuve-les-Avignon, and then to Silvacane at the end the twelfth century, and finally to the Abbey of Saint-André of Villeneuve-les-Avignon. This historical monument, restored in the nineteenth century, is constructed in a wilderness (a former place of pilgrimage for rain), and is characterised by a single nave with three bays, an arched barrel vault, an apse in a cul-de-oven, and two chapels forming a triangular Gothic transept tower.

=== Lambesc and the Fountains ===
There are fountains built between the sixteenth and eighteenth centuries, on the Rue de la Republique. The best example is at the city gate of the sixteenth century, called "Around the Jacquemard" (MH) built on the former grounds of the fourteenth century and surmounted by a clock with automata from 1598, replaced in 1882 and recently restored, with many mansions of the sixteenth century and seventeenth century such as the old hotel Pagy Valbonne (IMH), recently restored in 1635, with a Renaissance façade, mullioned windows, and the hotels Arquier, Cadenet-Charleval of Alamanon of Faudran Laval, Lauris of Taillades, and Saint-Chamas.

In rural areas there are: the Field of Aiguebelle 17thC (IMH) with Wings from 18thC; a park and statue of Neptune, ponds, three fountains (MH); Pavilion Bidaine dating from the seventeenth and its gardens (IMH), the "Castles" (from Béziers, Libran, of Taillades of Valbonnette of Bonrecueil with remnant of an older keep), mills and the Viaduct Valbonnette, the cave dwellings of St. Anne-de-Goiron (IMH), a Monument to the Resistance, the lodgings of St. Anne.

=== The Church of Our Lady of the Assumption (1700–1741) ===
The Church of Our Lady of the Assumption is integrated within the pastoral unit of 'three stones': Lambesc, Rognes, and Saint-Cannat. It has a large octagonal dome that gives plenty of light.

This "house" was founded in the sixteenth century (in 1512) at the southern entrance of the village. Part of the cemetery that had been there and the cemetery chapel were levelled.

The community fathers of the Holy Trinity consisted, on average, of a dozen canons. They also had the responsibility of the hospice. This order, founded in France in 1198, by Saint John of Matha and St. Felix de Valois, has 81 houses and 384 members. Their mission was originally to redeem Christian captives in the Barbary States.

The St. Therese Convent was founded by the House of Lorraine. The community wanted to offer the building as a school for girls of the nobility. But it was decided to use the building to house the sisters of St. Thomas of Villanova de Lamballe.

== See also ==
- Communes of the Bouches-du-Rhône department
