= The Ingenues =

American all-female vaudeville band

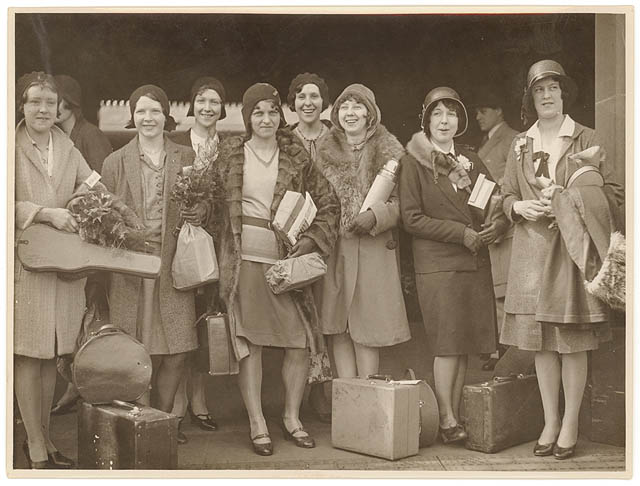
- The Ingenues in Sydney, Australia August, 1928

Background information
- Origin: Chicago, Illinois, U.S.
- Genre: Jazz
- Years active: mid-1920s – mid-1930s
- Label: Vitaphone

The Ingenues were a vaudeville all-female jazz band active in the 1920s, known as the Jazz Age, from 1925 to 1937, known for their versatility of acts and international tours. The term vaudeville means a large group performance act featuring many unrelated actions, often including acrobats, magicians, comedians, dancers, dingers, trained animals etc.

== Founding ==
The group's founding is attributed to a merger of smaller groups whose leader was Beth Vance. These groups included The Harmony Belles, Her Co-eds, and Beth Vance. Marie Novak (passed away in July 1980), who had previously played the piano for the Humming Birds orchestra later replaced Beth as the lead.

== Early career ==
The Ingenues toured the United States and other countries from 1925 to 1937. William Morris started the group. Managed by Edward Gorman Sherman (1880–1940), the orchestra performed with great popularity around the world in variety theater, vaudeville and picture houses, often billed as "The Girl Paul Whitemans of Syncopation," due to their significant use of stage sets, costumes, instrumentations and technicians. In addition, they are considered important rivals to the Paul Whiteman's Orchestra, owing to their popularity in the U.S and worldwide. While they were not the only all-girl band of the period, they were the most famous.

They performed many songs in the Ziegfeld Follies of 1927, Glorifying the American Girl, including the first act finale, "Melody Land," featuring 12 white baby grand pianos. Other Follies numbers featured violins, banjoes and saxophones from The Ingenues. The group performed popular songs, light classical works and novelties. They were celebrated for their versatility, as most members, including star soloist and "trick trombonist" Paula Jones, both novelty (accordions, harmonicas, banjos) and symphonic instruments. During the 1920s Jazz Age, vaudeville ensembles often required musicians to demonstrate versatility of mastery in multiple instruments, a practice known as "doubling."

The group toured Europe, South Africa, Asia, Australia and Brazil (where they also recorded for Columbia Records). The band appeared in film shorts including The Band Beautiful, Syncopating Sweeties and Maids and Music.. Beautiful (1828), was a compilation of four songs, which included:

1. Keep Sweeping The Cobwebs Off The Moon
2. Changes
3. Shaking The Blues Away
4. Tiger Rag

Among the songs produced by this group, these three are considered top songs by Apple Music: Shaking the blues Away, Keep Sweeping The CobWebs, and Tiger Rag. The list contains about twenty three songs.

Maids and Music was produced independently by Milton Schwarzwald's Nu-Atlas Productions and released as a 16mm home movie by Pictoreels. Sequences from this and other Schwarzwald short subjects were also re-edited into Soundies; in the case of Maids and Music the Soundies excerpt was titled "Ray Fabing's Versatile Ingenues".

== Members ==
According to Variety magazine in 1927, the players were:

- Mary Novak and Blanche Olson, piano
- Mary Donohue, Alice Plies, Dorothy Donohue, and Genevieve Brown, saxes and reeds
- Margaret Lichti, harp and banjo
- Virginia Myers and Gladys Young, trumpet
- Paula Jones, trombone and unaphone
- Jean Baumgarth and Bebe Colby, violin and cello
- Lucy Westgate, flute and cello
- Frances Gorton, xylophone and accordion
- Pauline Dove, drums
- Billie Jenks, bass
- Peggy O'Neil, entertainer

Other members over time included:

- Grace Brown
- Ruth Carnahan
- Juel Donahoe
- Mary Donahoe
- Velma Grimm
- Margaret Henke
- Adelaide Liefeld
- Alice Locklin
- Margaret Neal
- Marie Novak
- Virginia Roberts
- Mina Smith
- Louise Sorenson
- Lora Standish
- Beth Vance

Note: Three of the members were sisters-Mary Donahoe, Dorothy Donahoe, and Juel Donahoe. Mary played saxophone and reeds, Dorothy played similar instrumentation to Mary with the exception of trumpet; While Juel, who joined aged sixteen years as the youngest member, played trumpet.

== Later years ==
The band's last major tour was in 1932. While it is said that one of the group's last engagements was "at a Mount Morris High School in Freeport, Illinois," the latest primary source documentation has the group appearing in Monticello, IN in July 1938.. The group simply faded away, similar to many vaudeville acts.
