= Joseph Toussaint Reinaud =

French orientalist (1795–1867)

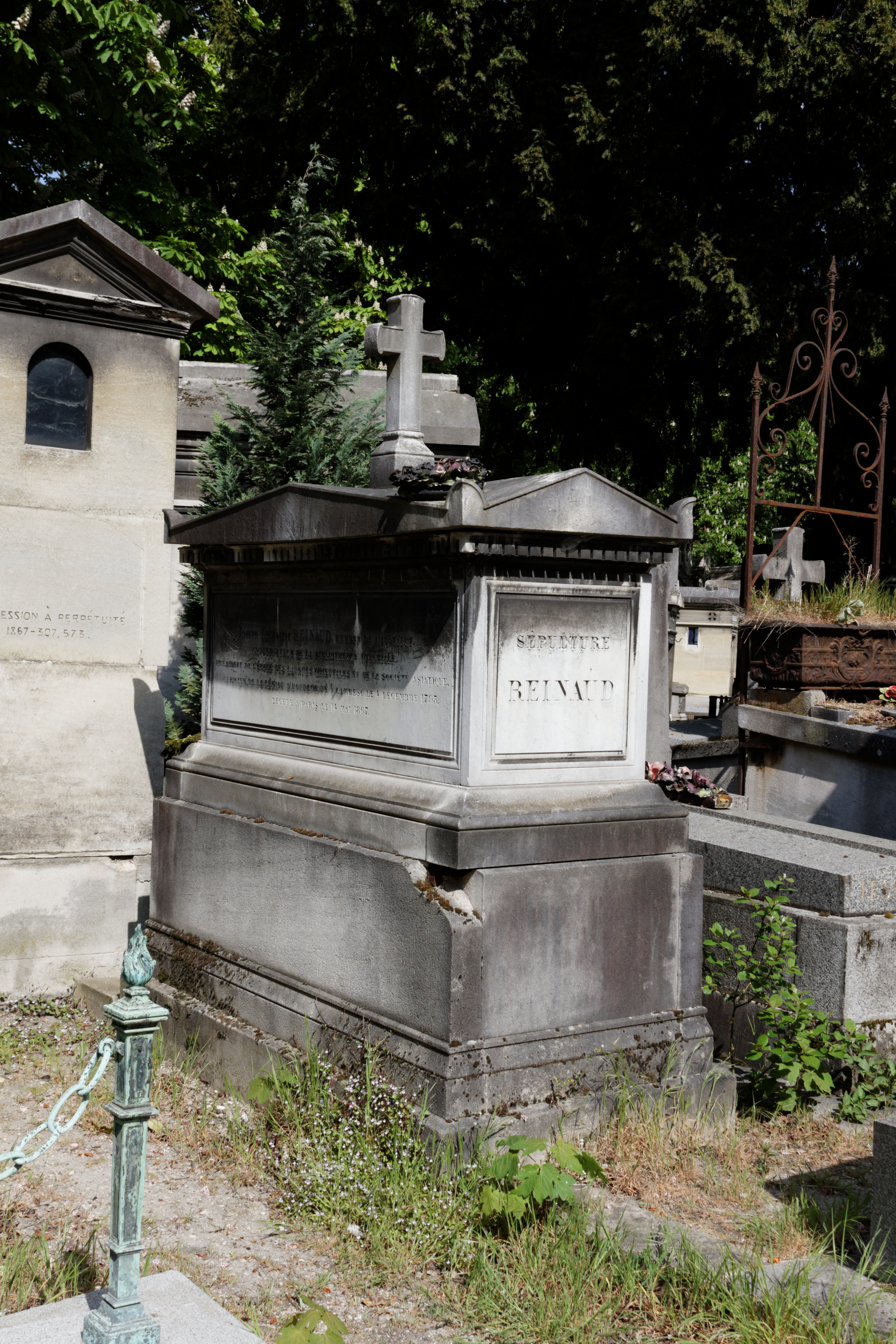
- Gravesite of Reinaud at Père Lachaise Cemetery (division 66)
- Born: 4 December 1795; Lambesc
- Died: 14 May 1867 (aged 71); Paris

Joseph Toussaint Reinaud (4 December 1795 – 14 May 1867) was a French orientalist.

== Life ==
Joseph Toussaint Reinaud was born at Lambesc, Bouches-du-Rhône. He came to Paris in 1815, and became a pupil of Silvestre de Sacy. In 1818-19 he was at Rome as an attaché to the French minister, during which time, he conducted investigations of manuscripts and gave special attention to Muslim coins.

In 1824 he entered the department of oriental manuscripts in the Royal Library at Paris, and in 1838, on the death of De Sacy, he succeeded to his chair in the School of Living Oriental Languages. In 1847 he became president of the Asiatic Society, and in 1858 conservator of oriental manuscripts in the Imperial Library.

His first important work was his classic description of the collections of the Duc de Blacas (1828). To history he contributed an essay on the Arab invasions of France, Savoy, Piedmont and Switzerland (Invasions des Sarrazins en France, et de France en Savoie, en Piémont et dans la Suisse, 1836), and various collections for the period of the crusades; he edited (1840), and in part translated (1848), the geography of Abulfeda.

To him too is due a useful edition of the very curious records of early Arab intercourse with China of which Eusèbe Renaudot had given but an imperfect translation (Relation des voyages, etc., 1845), and various other essays illustrating the ancient and medieval geography of the East.
