= Alphonse Tavernier =

French painter and poet

- Born: 1852; Saint-Cannat, Bouches-du-Rhône, Provence-Alpes-Côte d'Azur, France
- Died: 1933 (aged 80–81)
- Occupations: Painter, poet

Alphonse Tavernier (1852–1933) was a French painter and Provençal poet.

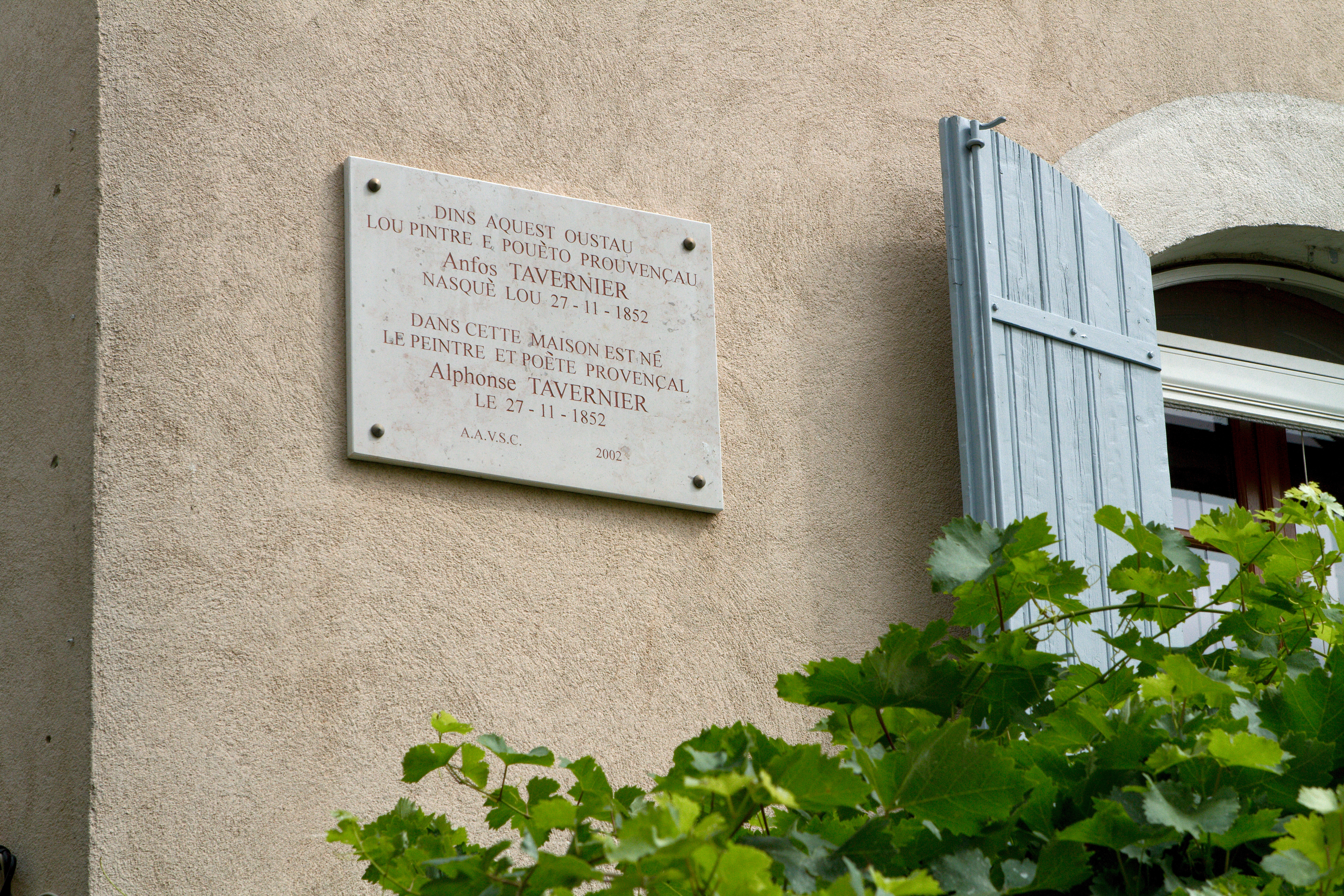
Memorial plaque.

== Early life ==
Alphone Tavernier was born on November 27, 1852, in Saint-Cannat.

== Career ==
Tavernier was a painter and Provençal poet.

In 1896, he did an oil painting entitled Vue générale de Saint Cannat en 1896. It is exhibited at the Musée Suffren-Saint Cannat.

== Death ==
Tavernier died in 1933.
