= Trévaresse =

The Trévaresse is a series of hilltops in the Bouches-du-Rhône, France.

They run from Saint-Cannat to Lambesc and are covered by many vineyards. The soil is made of clay and limestone. There is a former volcano, whose crater is the site of Château Beaulieu.
