= List of Graded Music Series =

This is a list of graded music series.

A graded music series is a set of instructional texts for teaching music.

- Vocal Music Readers by Joseph Bird (Oliver Ditson Company, 1861)
- The Song Garden by Lowell Mason (Oliver Ditson Company, 1864)
- First Steps in Music by George Loomis (1866)
- The National Music Course by Luther Whiting Mason (Boston: Ginn, 1870)
- The Elementary Music Reader by Benjamin Jepson (A. S. Barnes, 1871)
- The Graded School Singer by Orlando Blackman and E. E. Whittemore (1873)
- The Normal Music Course (D. Appleton and Company, 1883)
- The Tonic Sol-Fa Music Course by Daniel Batchellor and Thomas Charmbury (Boston: Oliver Ditson & Co., 1884)
- Public School Music Course by Charles E. Whiting (1889)
- The Model Music Course by J. A. Broekhaven ad A. J. Gantvoort (1895)
- The Natural Music Course by Thomas Tapper and Frederick Ripley (American Book Company, 1895)
- Harmonic Course in Music by Thomas Tapper and Frederick Ripley (American Book Company, 1903)
- Melodic Course in Music by Thomas Tapper and Frederick Ripley (American Book Company, 1905)
