= Doubles =

Men's doubles, Women's doubles or Mixed doubles are sports having two players per side, including;

- Beach volleyball
- Doubles badminton
- Doubles curling
- Footvolley
- Doubles pickleball
- Doubles squash
- Doubles table tennis
- Doubles tennis

Doubles may also refer to:

== Entertainment ==
- Doubles (1985 play), a Broadway production by David Wiltse
- Doubles (2000 film), a 2000 Tamil-language film
- Doubles (2011 film), a 2011 Malayalam-language film

== Other ==
- Doubles (food), a Trinidadian food item
- Doubles (bells), a ringing method rung on five church bells
- A type of semi-trailer truck

== See also ==
- Double (disambiguation)
