= Double Lake =

Lake in the state of Minnesota, United States

- Location within Minnesota
- Location: Cottonwood County, Minnesota
- Coordinates: 44°3′N 95°22.5′W
- Type: lake

Double Lake is a pair of lakes in Cottonwood County, in the U.S. state of Minnesota.

Double Lake was named from the fact these twin lakes are separated only by a narrow passage.
