= Doubling =

Doubling may refer to:

== Mathematics ==
- Arithmetical doubling of a count or a measure, expressed as:
  - Multiplication by 2
  - Increase by 100%, i.e. one-hundred percent
  - Doubling the cube (i. e., hypothetical geometric construction of a cube with twice the volume of a given cube)
- Doubling time, the length of time required for a quantity to double in size or value
- Doubling map, a particular infinite two-dimensional geometrical construction

== Music ==
- The composition or performance of a melody with itself or itself transposed at a constant interval such as the octave, third, or sixth, Voicing (music)#Doubling
- The assignment of a melody to two instruments in an arrangement
- The playing of two (or more) instruments alternately by a single player, e.g. Flute, doubling piccolo
  - Musicians who play more than one woodwind instrument are called woodwind doublers or reed players
- Double tracking, a recording technique in which a musical part (or vocal) is recorded twice and mixed together, to strengthen or "fatten" the tone.

== Other ==
- Doubling in the theatre is where one actor plays more than one part in the same performance.
- Doubling (textiles) is the process where six slivers of cotton are fed into a draw frame, stretched and drawn together to improve the uniformity of the roving before it is spun
- Doubling (naval tactic) was a means of focusing gunfire in formations of sailing warships maneuvering as a line of battle.
- Double knitting is the process of combining two or more lengths of yarn into a single thread.
- Doubling in two-way radio, where two or more transmitters transmit at once on the same frequency, interfering with one another and garbling all messages.
- Syntactic doubling is a phenomenon consisting in the lengthening (gemination) of the initial consonant of certain words
- When more than one round is fired in a semiautomatic gas powered rifle with only one pull of the trigger, also known as a slam fire.
- Doubling trains tracks has two tracks for two direction traffic.

== See also ==
- Double (disambiguation)
- Period-doubling bifurcation
