= Château de Beaupré =

French bastide, vineyard and winery

Coordinates: 43.6088°N 5.3533°E

Château de Beaupré is a French bastide, vineyard and winery in Saint-Cannat, Bouches-du-Rhône, France.

== History ==
The bastide was built in 1739. In 1854, it was purchased by the Double family, ennobled in 1378. The estate served as a stopping-point for their horses on the way between their properties in the Luberon and in Marseille.

In 1890, Baron Emile Double (1869–1938) planted the first vineyards and built a vaulted cellar where he produced his wine in 100-hectolitre wooden vats. Simultaneously, he started selling his wine to cafes in Marseille. His son, Henri Double (1903–2002) expanded the vineyard to 32 hectares. In 1909, an earthquake destroyed the second floor, and the bastide had to be partly rebuilt. In 1969, he planted the first Cabernet Sauvignon on the estate.

Christian Double, his son, expanded the estate to 42 hectares and modernised the cellar, adding temperature control systems and rearing both red and white wine in barrels. His wife, Marie Jeanne Double, opened the estate to the public for art exhibitions and wine tasting. Their children, Maxime and Phanette, also work for the family business. Maxime Double runs Wines Tree, a wine wholesaler, while Phanette Double is the current owner.

The estate is located on the Route nationale 7.

== Vineyard ==
The vineyard of 42 hectares sits on the Trévaresse hills, whose soil is made of clay and limestone. The oldest vines date back to the 1960s, and every year 1 hectare is replanted. The vineyard includes red wine grapes exist in Cabernet Sauvignon, Syrah and Grenache; Rosé in Cinsault, Syrah and Grenache; and White in Rolle, Grenache blanc, Sémillon and Sauvignon.
