= Saint-Cannat =

Commune in Provence-Alpes-Côte d'Azur, France

Saint-Cannat Sant Canat (Occitan)
- Commune
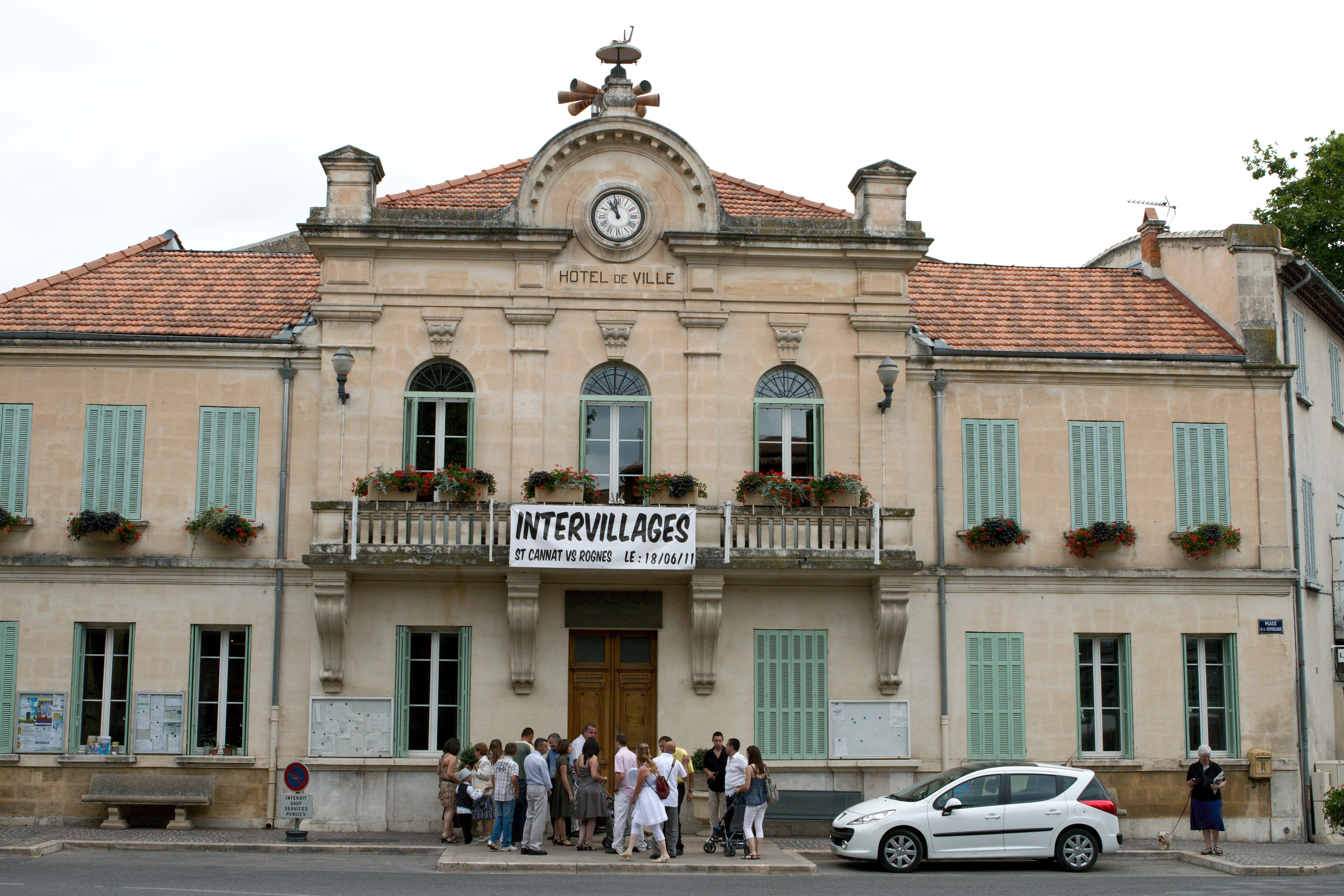
- Saint-Cannat Town Hall

- Coat of arms
- Location of Saint-Cannat
- Location within France Location within Provence-Alpes-Côte d'Azur
- Coordinates: 43°37′12″N 5°17′55″E
- Country: France
- Region: Provence-Alpes-Côte d'Azur
- Department: Bouches-du-Rhône
- Arrondissement: Aix-en-Provence
- Canton: Pélissanne
- Intercommunality: Aix-Marseille-Provence

Government
  - Mayor (2026–32): Joël Levi-Valensi
- Area^{1}: 36.54 km^{2} (14.11 sq mi)
- Elevation: 212 m (696 ft)
- Highest elevation: 391 m (1,283 ft)
- Lowest elevation: 159 m (522 ft)
- Population (2023): 6,097
  - Density: 166.9/km^{2} (432.2/sq mi)
- Demonym: Saint-Cannadens
- Time zone: UTC+01:00 (CET)
  - Summer (DST): UTC+02:00 (CEST)
- INSEE/Postal code: 13091 /13760
- Website: saint-cannat.fr
- ^{1} French Land Register data, which excludes lakes, ponds, glaciers > 1 km^{2} (0.386 sq mi or 247 acres) and river estuaries.

Saint-Cannat (French pronunciation: [sɛ̃ kana]; Occitan: Sant Canat) is a commune in the Bouches-du-Rhône department in the Provence-Alpes-Côte d'Azur region in Southern France. Part of the Aix-Marseille-Provence Metropolis, it is located just northwest of Aix-en-Provence, seat of the larger arrondissement.

== History ==
The village was named after Canus Natus, a 5th-century Roman Catholic saint, who was a Roman clergyman born with white hair, a quirk synonymous with great wisdom at the time. He was buried in Saint-Cannat, although there was no such place at the time, but soon enough several houses were built into a hamlet.

In the 12th century, Archbishop Pierre mentioned Castrum Santi - Cannati in a paper. In the 13th century, villagers turned on their archbishop and pledged allegiance to the lord of Les Baux, and then to the kings of Sicily (namely, Frederic III of Aragon, or perhaps Louis XIII). This, however, only lasted three years. In the same century, the Knights Templar established a settlement there.

Navy officer Pierre André de Suffren was born here on 17 July 1729. A century later, Alphonse Tavernier, a poet, was born here on 27 November 1852.

On 11 June 1909 a terrible earthquake, the largest ever recorded in metropolitan France, destroyed almost everything in the area. Shortly after, the houses were re-built in the same architectural style. Both in 1984 and 1994 huge floods ravaged most houses.

It has retained several fountains dating back to the 17th and 18th century, the remains of the medieval ramparts and the château, which today houses the town hall and museum. The Route nationale 7 bisects the village.

There is a polo club, Polo Club de Saint Cannat, opened in the 1970s. It organises the Open d'Aix and the Tournoi de Noël every year. There is also an entertainment park called the Village des automates.

It is also home to the winery Château de Beaupré, started by Baron Émile Double (1869–1938) in 1890. The creek Budéou flows through the village.

== Demographics ==
Historical population

Year	Pop.	±% p.a.
1793	1,759	—
1800	2,009	+1.92%
1806	1,921	−0.74%
1821	1,813	−0.39%
1831	1,655	−0.91%
1836	1,701	+0.55%
1841	1,721	+0.23%
1846	1,994	+2.99%
1851	2,006	+0.12%
1856	1,983	−0.23%
1861	1,929	−0.55%
1866	1,812	−1.24%
1872	1,710	−0.96%
1876	1,535	−2.66%
1881	1,403	−1.78%
1886	1,269	−1.99%
1891	1,235	−0.54%
1896	1,212	−0.38%
1901	1,292	+1.29%

Year	Pop.	±% p.a.
1906	1,232	−0.95%
1911	1,278	+0.74%
1921	1,058	−1.87%
1926	1,135	+1.41%
1931	1,137	+0.04%
1936	1,074	−1.13%
1946	1,034	−0.38%
1954	1,086	+0.62%
1962	1,254	+1.81%
1968	1,675	+4.94%
1975	1,862	+1.52%
1982	2,384	+3.59%
1990	3,918	+6.41%
1999	4,634	+1.88%
2007	5,265	+1.61%
2012	5,431	+0.62%
2017	5,634	+0.74%
2023	6,097	+1.32%

Source: EHESS and INSEE (1968–2023)

== Gallery ==
Saint-Cannat
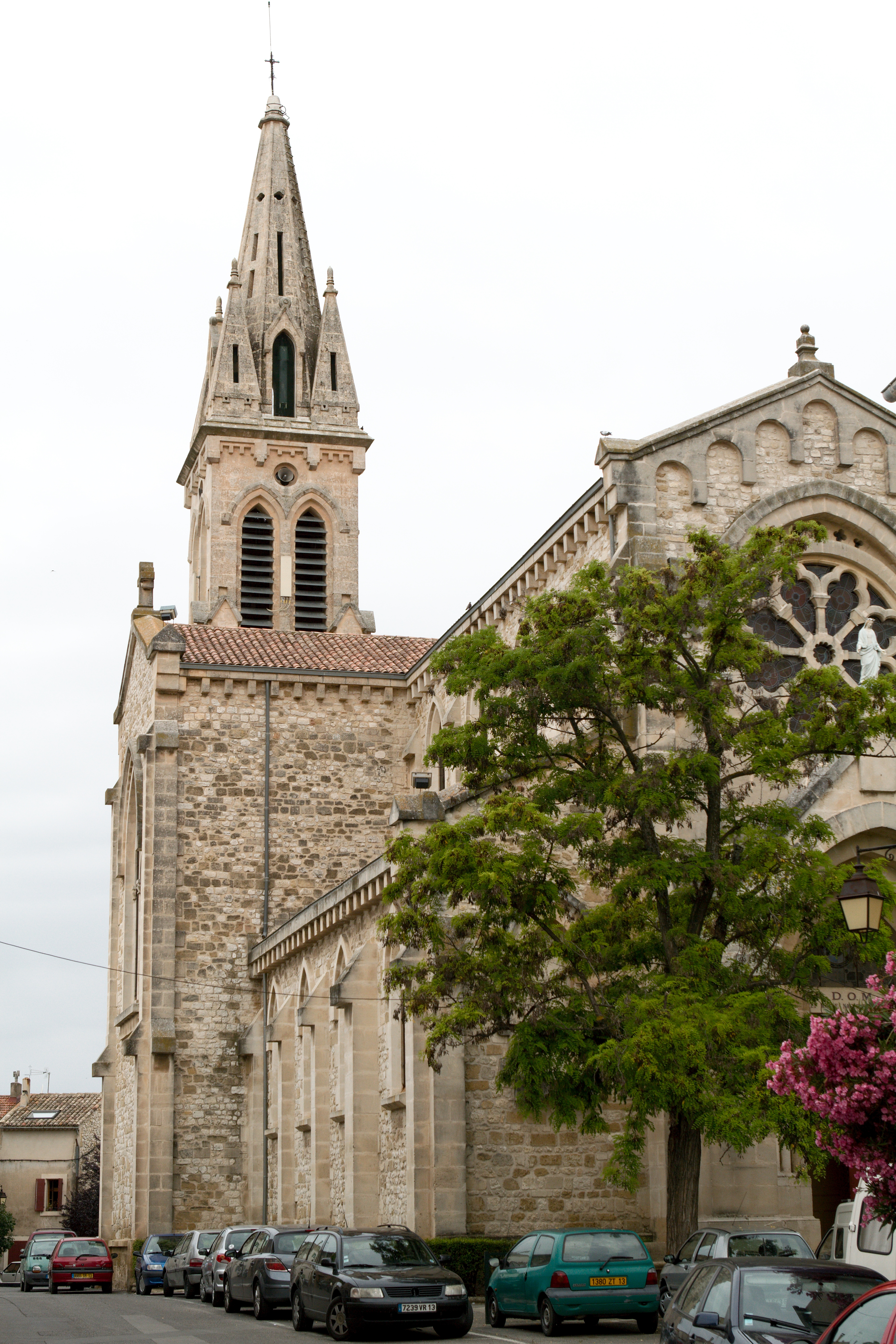
Roman Catholic church

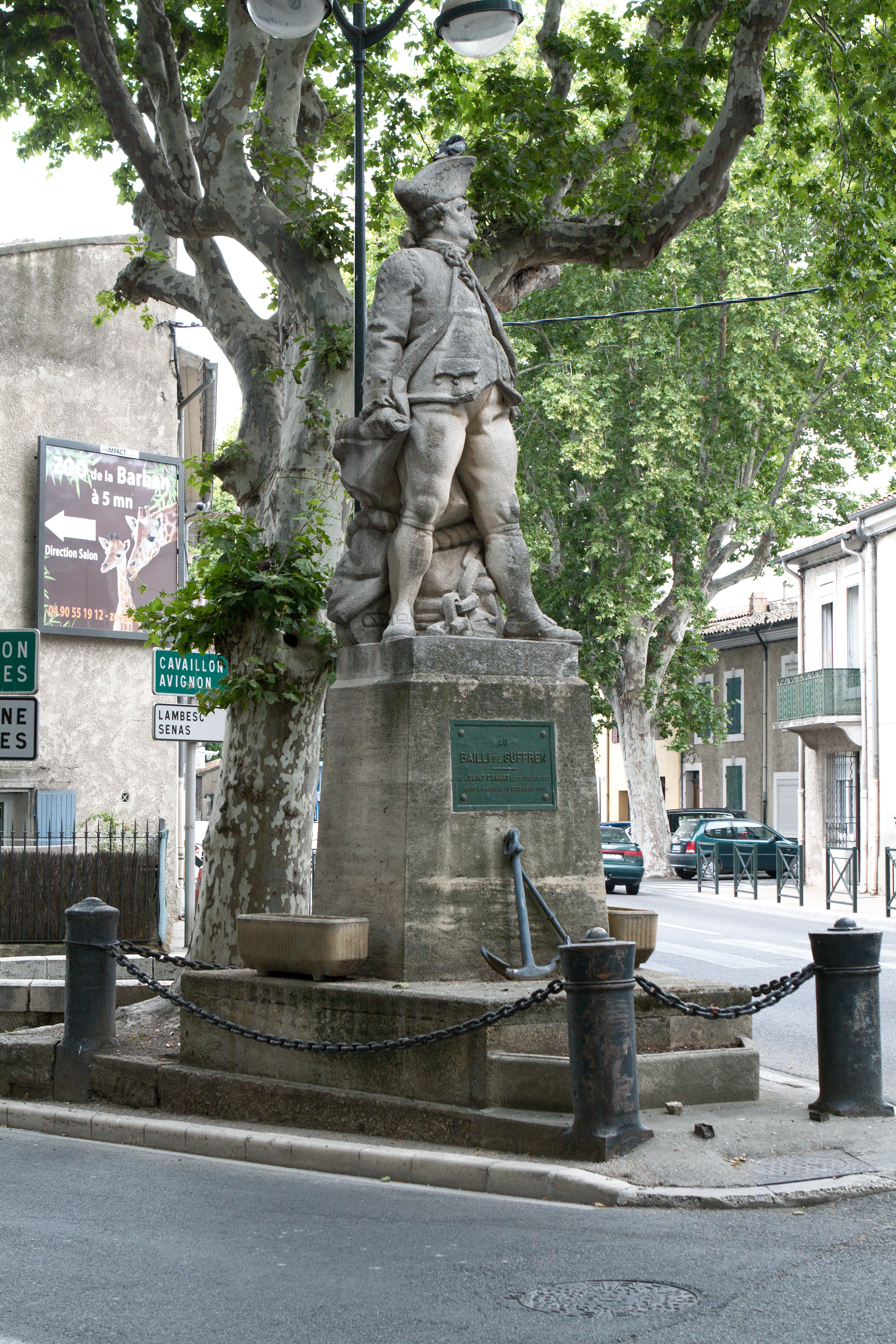
Statue of Pierre André de Suffren

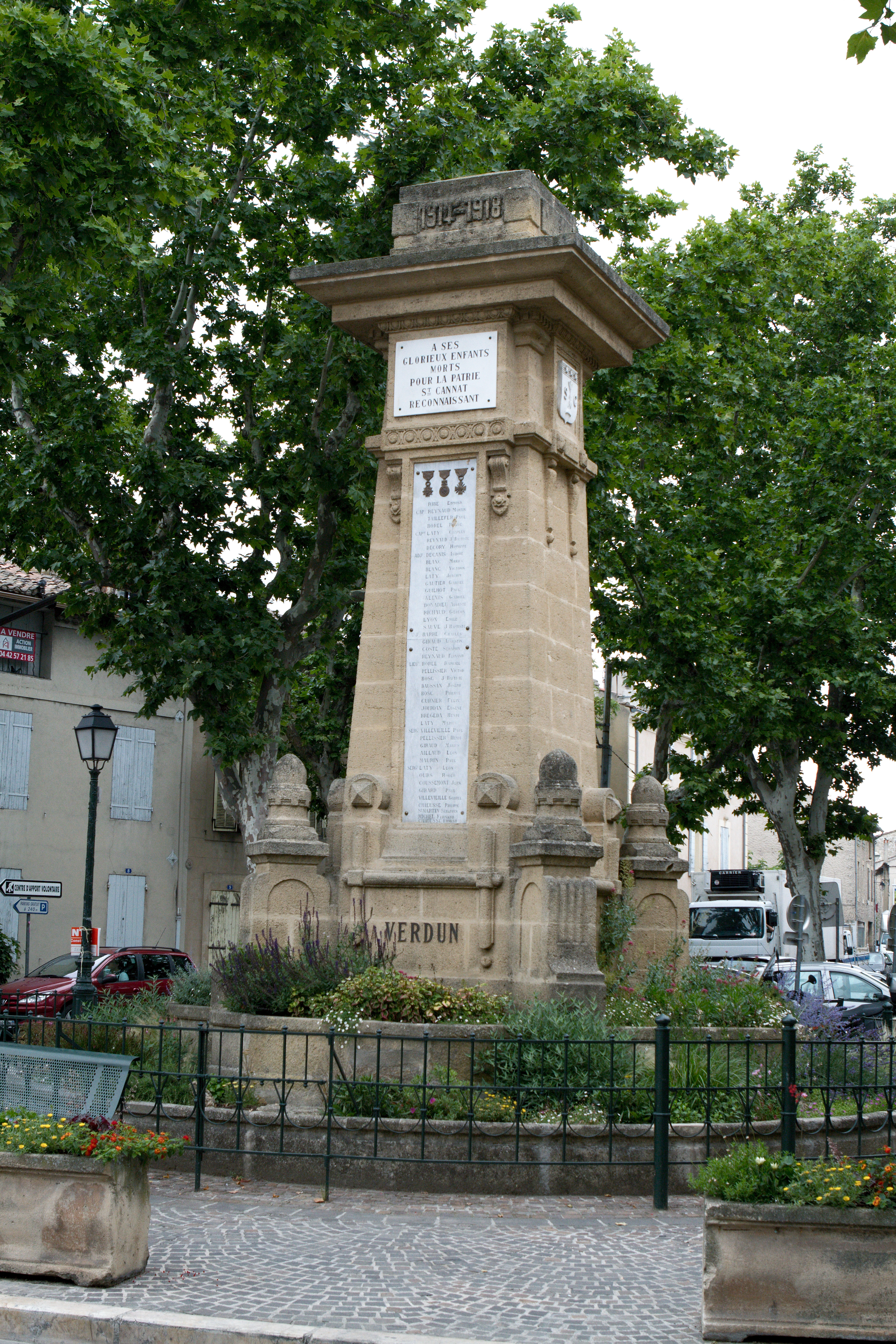
War memorial

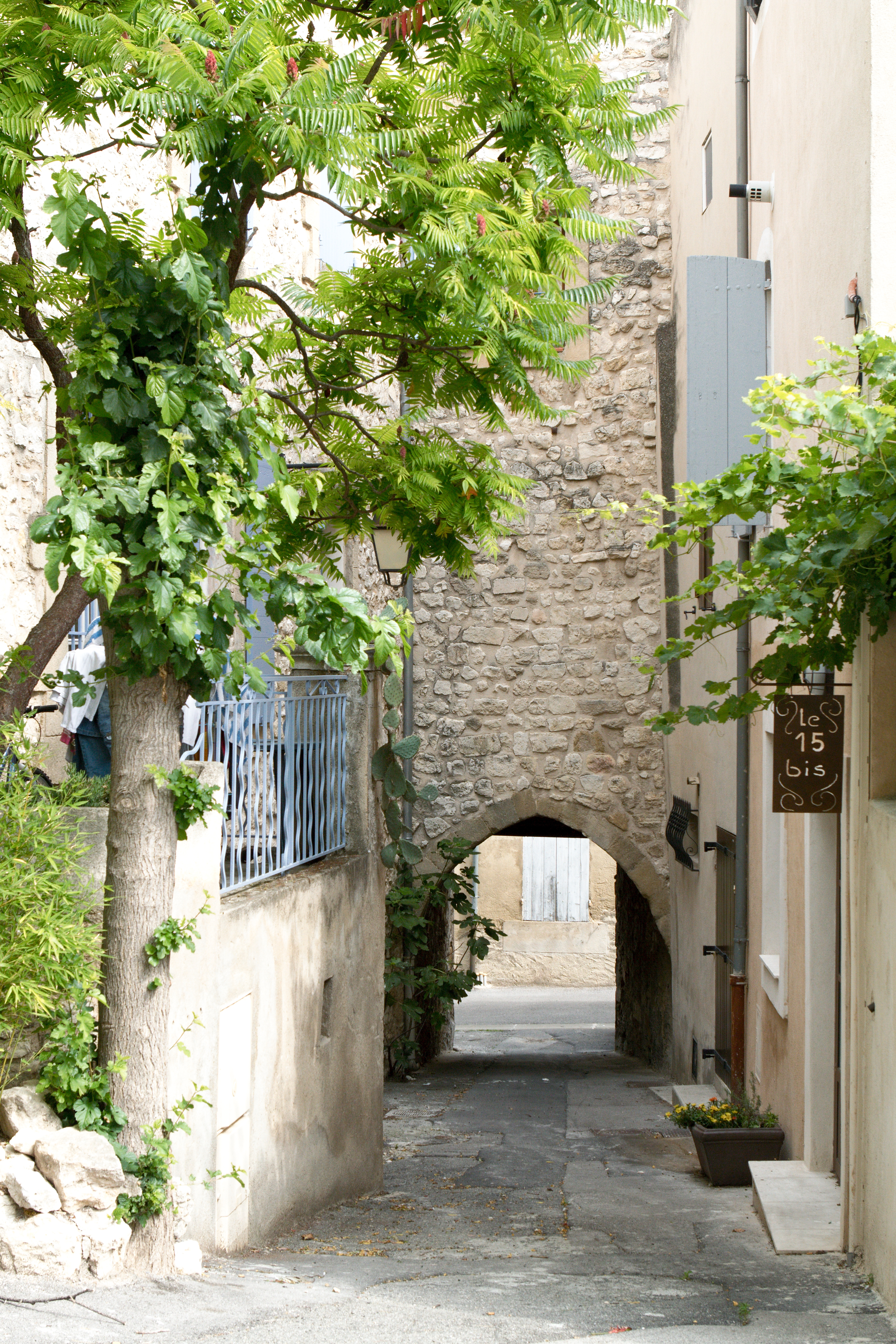
An alley in Saint-Cannat
