= Tecno Spark 9 =

Android-based Chinese smartphones

Tecno Spark 9T Tecno Spark 9 Pro
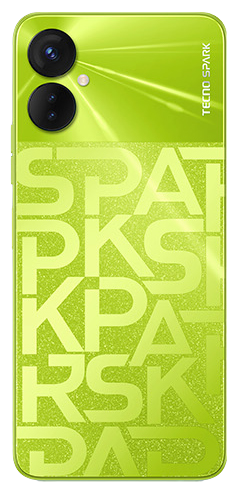
- Back of Tecno Spark 9 Pro
- Brand: Tecno Spark
- Manufacturer: Tecno Mobile
- Type: Phablet
- Series: Spark 9
- First released: 6 June 2022; 4 years ago
- Predecessor: Tecno Spark 8
- Successor: Tecno Spark 10
- Compatible networks: 2G; 3G; 4G; 4G LTE
- Form factor: Slate
- Dimensions: Spark 9T: 164.3 mm × 75.6 mm × 8.7 mm (6.47 in × 2.98 in × 0.34 in); Spark 9 Pro: 164.2 mm × 75.6 mm × 8.4 mm (6.46 in × 2.98 in × 0.33 in)
- Operating system: Android 12 with HiOS 8.6
- System-on-chip: Spark 9T: MediaTek Helio G37; Spark 9 Pro: MediaTek Helio G85
- CPU: Octa-core (2x2.0 GHz Cortex-A75 & 6x1.8 GHz Cortex-A55), Octa-core (4x2.3 GHz Cortex-A53 & 4x1.8 GHz Cortex-A53)
- GPU: PowerVR GE8320, Mali-G52 MC2
- Memory: Spark 9T: 4 GB RAM; Spark 9 Pro: 4/6 GB RAM
- Storage: Spark 9T: 64/128 GB; Spark 9 Pro: 128 GB
- Removable storage: microSD
- SIM: nanoSIM
- Battery: 5000 mAh
- Charging: (18W for Spark 9 Pro)
- Rear camera: Spark 9T: 13 MP, (wide), AF + 2 MP, f/2.4, (depth); Spark 9 Pro: 50 MP, f/1.6, 27mm (wide), PDAF + 2 MP, f/2.5, (depth) + QVGA, f/2.0; All: Quad LED flash, HDR, panorama, 1080p@30fps Video: 1080p@30fps
- Front camera: 32MP, (wide) All: Dual-LED flash, 1080p@30fps
- Display: 720 x 1600 720p, 1080 x 2460 1080p IPS LCD capacitive touchscreen; Spark 9T: 6.6 in (164.3 mm), (266 ppi); Spark 9 Pro: 6.6 in (164.2 mm), (407 ppi)
- Sound: 3.5mm Headphone jack
- Connectivity: Bluetooth 5.0; Wi-Fi 802.11 b/g/n USB 2.0; USB-C; USB On-The-Go
- Data inputs: Accelerometer; Fingerprint scanner; Gyroscope; Proximity sensor; Intelligent digital assistant; Face ID
- Model: KH6 (Spark 9T); KH7 (Spark 9 Pro)
- Website: Tecno Spark 9 Pro

Tecno Spark 9T and Tecno Spark 9 Pro are Android-based smartphones manufactured, released and marketed by Tecno Mobile as part of Tecno Spark 9 series. The devices serve as successors to Tecno Spark 8 series.

The Spark 9T and Spark 9 Pro is an upgraded version of Spark 8 series, coming with different features, including the processor, camera and design. The phone has received generally favorable reviews, with critics mostly noting the design and the selfie camera. Critics, however, criticized the lack of higher refresh rate in the Spark 9 Pro.

== Specifications ==
=== Hardware ===
The Spark 9T feature a 720p resolution with an 20:9 aspect ratio, while the Spark 9 Pro feature a 1080p resolution with an 20:9 aspect ratio. Both phones feature a display size of 6.6-inches. Spark 9T comes with a MediaTek Helio G37 SoC, while the Spark 9 Pro comes with a MediaTek Helio G85 SoC. The Spark 9T comes with 4 GB of RAM, while the Spark 9 Pro comes with 4/6 GB of RAM. Spark 9T comes with 64/128 GB storage, while Spark 9 Pro comes with 128 GB storage. All of the device feature the ability to use a microSD. Both devices come with a battery capacity of 5000 mAh, with the Spark 9 Pro supporting fast charging of 18 watt. Spark 9T feature a dual rear camera with a 13-megapixel main camera and 2-megapixel depth, while the Spark 9 Pro feature also feature a dual rear camera but with a 50-megapixel main camera and 2-megapixel depth. Both devices feature a 32-megapixel front camera.

=== Software ===
Both devices run on Android 12, with HiOS 8.6. The HiOS 8.6 features Photo video, Camera pro mode, RAM extension and Smart scenes.

== Reception ==
Tech Arena24 praised the Spark 9 Pro for its selfie camera and display while noting that the device has "a beautiful design". However, the lack of higher refresh rate was criticized.

Ak Fred Fred praised the Spark 9 Pro for its design and selfie camera while noting that "the fingerprint scanner is fast and responsive all the time". He however criticized the device for the lack of dual speaker for "a better sound experience".

Izzy Boye praised the Spark 9 Pro for its design, storage and processor. However, the lack of stereo speakers and higher refresh rate was criticized.

Eugoson Quorch praised the Spark 9T for its design, USB-C port and higher refresh rate compared to the Spark 9 Pro, while noting that "the selfie camera is the unique selling point of the smartphone".
