= Tecno Spark 40 =

Android-based Chinese smartphones

Tecno Spark 40 Tecno Spark 40 Pro Tecno Spark 40 Pro+
- Brand: Tecno Spark
- Manufacturer: Tecno Mobile
- Type: Phablet
- Series: Spark 40
- First released: 2 July 2025; 15 months ago
- Predecessor: Tecno Spark 20
- Compatible networks: 2G, 3G, 4G, 4G LTE
- Form factor: Slate
- Colors: Ink Black; Titanium Grey; Mirage Blue; Veil White
- Dimensions: Spark 40: 165.6 mm (6.52 in) H 77 mm (3.0 in) W 7.67 mm (0.302 in) D; Spark 40 Pro: 163.9 mm (6.45 in) H 75.8 mm (2.98 in) W 6.69 mm (0.263 in) D; Spark 40 Pro+: 163.9 mm (6.45 in) H 75.8 mm (2.98 in) W 6.49 mm (0.256 in) D
- Weight: Spark 40: 188 g
- Operating system: Android 15 with HiOS 15.1 SPARK 40 Pro 3 Years update in Android (in china only) SPARK 40 Pro+ 3 Years Update in Android (in china only)
- System-on-chip: Spark 40: MediaTek Helio G81; Spark 40 Pro: MediaTek Helio G100 Ultimate; Spark 40 Pro+: MediaTek Helio G200
- CPU: Octa-core
- Memory: Spark 40: 4/8 GB RAM; Spark 40 Pro and Spark 40 Pro+: 8 GB RAM
- Storage: 128/256 GB
- Removable storage: microSD
- SIM: nanoSIM
- Battery: 5200 mAh
- Charging: Spark 40 & 40 Pro: 45W wired Spark 40 Pro+: 45W wired, 30W wireless, 5W reverse wireless
- Rear camera: Spark 40: 50 MP (wide); Spark 40 Pro and Spark 40 Pro+: 50 MP (wide) with auxiliary sensor
- Front camera: Spark 40: 8 MP; Spark 40 Pro and Spark 40 Pro+: 13 MP
- Display: Spark 40: 6.67 in (169 mm) IPS LCD, 720 × 1600, 120 Hz refresh rate; Spark 40 Pro: 6.78 in (172 mm) flat AMOLED, 1224 × 2720, 144 Hz refresh rate; Spark 40 Pro+: 6.78 in (172 mm) curved AMOLED, 1224 × 2720, 144 Hz refresh rate
- Sound: Dual speakers
- Connectivity: Bluetooth, Wi-Fi, USB-C, NFC, FM radio
- Data inputs: Sensors: Accelerometer; Fingerprint scanner (Side-mounted on Spark 40/Pro, under-display on Pro+); Gyroscope; Proximity sensor; Magnetometer; Infrared remote control
- Water resistance: IP64 water/dust resistance
- Website: Tecno Spark 40 Series

The Tecno Spark 40, Tecno Spark 40 Pro, and Tecno Spark 40 Pro+ are Android-based smartphones manufactured, released and marketed by Tecno Mobile as part of the Tecno Spark 40 series. The devices, announced on 2 July 2025, serve as successors to the Tecno Spark 20 series.

The Spark 40 series is notable for being the launch platform for MediaTek's Helio G200 chipset in the Spark 40 Pro+ model. The lineup was also promoted for its durability features, with all models receiving an IP64 rating for dust and water resistance and a claimed drop resistance of up to 1.5 meters.

== Specifications ==
=== Hardware ===
The Spark 40 series consists of three models with distinct hardware configurations. The base Spark 40 features a 6.67-inch HD+ IPS LCD with a 120 Hz refresh rate. It supports Wi-fi Display, which projects content from a mobile to another Display (TV, Monitor, or Projector) without needing physical cables. It is powered by the MediaTek Helio G81 system-on-chip (SoC), paired with up to 8 GB of RAM and up to 256 GB of storage.

The Spark 40 Pro and Spark 40 Pro+ both feature a larger 6.78-inch 1.5K (1224x2720 pixels) AMOLED display with a 144 Hz refresh rate; the Pro model has a flat screen, while the Pro+ has a curved screen. The Spark 40 Pro uses a MediaTek Helio G100 Ultimate SoC, while the Spark 40 Pro+ is the first device to use the MediaTek Helio G200 SoC. Both Pro models come with 8 GB of RAM and up to 256 GB of storage.

All three models are equipped with a 5200 mAh battery and support 45W wired fast charging. The Spark 40 Pro+ adds support for 30W wireless and 5W reverse wireless charging. For photography, all models have a 50-megapixel main rear camera. The Pro models include an unspecified auxiliary sensor. On the front, the Spark 40 has an 8-megapixel camera, while the Pro and Pro+ models have a 13-megapixel camera. All models include dual speakers and an infrared remote control blaster.

==== Build ====
The Tecno Spark 40 has a Dimension of 165.6 x 77 x 7.7 mm and Weight 188g consists of a glass front, a plastic back, and a plastic frame. It is rated IP64, indicating resistance to dust and water splashes, as well as drop resistance up to 1.5 meters. The Mobile is available in four colors: Ink Black, Titanium Gray, Mirage Blue, and Veil White.

Color	Name
	Ink Black
	Titanium Grey
	Mirage Blue
	Veil White

=== Software ===
All devices in the Spark 40 series run on Android 15 with Tecno's HiOS 15.1 skin. The software includes several AI-powered features, such as the "Ask Ella" on-screen assistant, "AI Writing" for text generation and proofreading, and "AI Translate". The Pro models also feature "FreeLink" technology, which allows for direct device-to-device calls and messages via Bluetooth in areas with no cellular signal.

== Reception ==
The Tecno Spark 40 series received attention for its competitive specifications relative to its budget price point. Ilia Temelkov of PhoneArena noted that features like the 144 Hz display and 45W charging on the Pro+ model "put some iPhone 16 specs to shame," highlighting the value proposition of the series, although acknowledging the devices were not intended for the US market.

Online user commentary following the launch pointed out that the rear camera module's design bore similarities to smartphones from other major brands like Samsung and Apple.
