= Tecno Pouvoir 4 =

Android-based Chinese smartphones

Tecno Pouvoir 4 Tecno Pouvoir 4 Pro
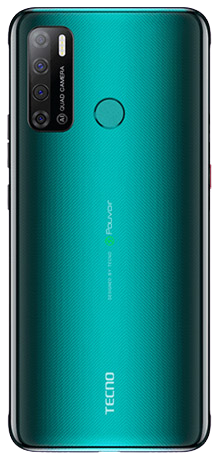
- Back of Tecno Pouvoir 4 Pro
- Brand: Tecno Pouvoir
- Manufacturer: Tecno Mobile
- Type: Phablet
- Series: Pouvoir 4
- First released: 7 July 2020; 5 years ago
- Predecessor: Tecno Pouvoir 3
- Compatible networks: 2G, 3G, 4G, 4G LTE
- Form factor: Slate
- Dimensions: 174.9 mm × 79.6 mm × 9.2 mm (6.89 in × 3.13 in × 0.36 in)
- Operating system: Android 10 with HiOS 6.1
- System-on-chip: Pouvoir 4: MediaTek Helio A22; Pouvoir 4 Pro: MediaTek Helio P22
- CPU: Helio: Octa-core (4x2.0 GHz Cortex-A53, 4x1.8 GHz Cortex-A53)
- GPU: PowerVR GE8320
- Memory: Pouvoir 4: 3 GB RAM; Pouvoir 4 Pro: 6 GB RAM
- Storage: 32/128 GB
- Removable storage: microSD, expandable up to 256 GB
- Battery: 6000 mAh
- Charging: (18W for Pouvoir 4 Pro)
- Rear camera: Pouvoir 4: 13 MP, f/1.8, (ultrawide) + 2MP, macro + 2MP, (depth) + QVGA; Pouvoir 4 Pro: 16 MP, f/1.8, (ultrawide) + 5MP, macro + 2MP, (depth) + QVGA; All: Quad LED flash, HDR, PDAF, 1080p@30fps, bokeh, panorama
- Front camera: Pouvoir 4: 8 MP, f/2.0, (wide); Pouvoir 4 Pro: 16 MP, f/2.0, (wide); All: 1080p@30fps
- Display: 720 x 1640 720p Dot Notch IPS LCD; 7.0 in (174.9 mm), (246 ppi)
- External display: Always On
- Sound: Loudspeaker
- Connectivity: Bluetooth 5.0; Wi-Fi 802.11 b/g/n 3G/LTE
- Data inputs: Sensors: Accelerometer; Fingerprint scanner; Gyroscope; Proximity sensor; Intelligent digital assistant; Face ID; Other: USB 2.0; 3.5mm Headphone jack
- Model: LC7 (Pouvoir 4); LC8 (Pouvoir 4 Pro)
- Website: Tecno Pouvoir 4 & Tecno Pouvoir 4 Pro

Tecno Pouvoir 4 and Tecno Pouvoir 4 Pro are Android-based smartphones manufactured, released and marketed by Tecno Mobile as part of Tecno Pouvoir 4 series. The devices were unveiled during a Facebook live event held on 7 July 2020 as successors to Tecno Pouvoir 3 series. It is the fourth generation of Tecno's Pouvoir Series of smartphones.

The Pouvoir 4 and Pouvoir 4 Pro is an upgraded version of Pouvoir 3 series, coming with different features, including the OS, camera, display and storage. The phone has received generally favorable reviews, with critics mostly noting the bigger battery and fast charging capacity. Critics, however, criticized the lack of HD+ display and USB Type-C port.

== Specifications ==
=== Hardware ===
The Pouvoir 4 and Pouvoir 4 Pro both feature a 720p resolution with an 20.5:9 aspect ratio. The device both feature a display size of 7.0-inches with Dot Notch IPS LCD. Pouvoir 4 comes with a MediaTek Helio A22 SoC, while the Pouvoir 4 Pro comes with MediaTek Helio P22. The Pouvoir 4 comes with 3 GB of RAM, while the Pouvoir 4 Pro comes with 6 GB of RAM. Pouvoir 4 comes with 32 GB storage, while Pouvoir 4 Pro comes with 128 GB storage. Both of the device feature the ability to use a microSD card to expand the storage to a maximum of 256 GB. Both devices come with a battery capacity of 6000 mAh. The Pouvoir 4 Pro support fast charging of 18 watt. The cameras on the Pouvoir 4 series improved considerably over its predecessors, featuring a Quad rear camera with Quad LED flash. The device come with dual stereo speakers and digital sound effects.

=== Software ===
The device ship with Android 10 with a new HiOS 6.1, unlike the versions found on Pouvoir 3 series. The HiOS 6.1 features Off Screen Mode, Magic Key and Game Mode Optimization. On 10 July 2020, the beta version of Android 11 was released to Pouvoir 4 series, making it the first MediaTek device to receive the update.

== Reception ==
George Kamau from Techweez gave a positive review of the Pouvoir 4, noting that "it's a budget smartphone that shouldn’t be overlooked". He went further to express his concerns, noting that the 720p resolution needs improvement.

John Adebimitan from TekGoblin praised the Pouvoir 4 performance, battery, camera and display, saying "I think the Pouvoir 4 is a great device and is worth every dime you spend on it". He however hoped for a larger storage space as seen in the Pro version.

Pouvoir 4 received a positive review from Techsawa. Praise was directed towards the display, performance and battery, while noting that the "storage seems very little".

An editor for Techmobile, noted that the Pouvoir 4 is a budget smartphone in her price range, judging from the design, battery and display. He criticized the lack of fast charging technology as seen in the Pro version and went further to state that the device "is a little weighty", while noting that "the plus outweighs the minus".
