= Tecno Camon 15 =

Android-based Chinese smartphones

Tecno Camon 15 Air Tecno Camon 15 Tecno Camon 15 Pro Tecno Camon 15 Premier
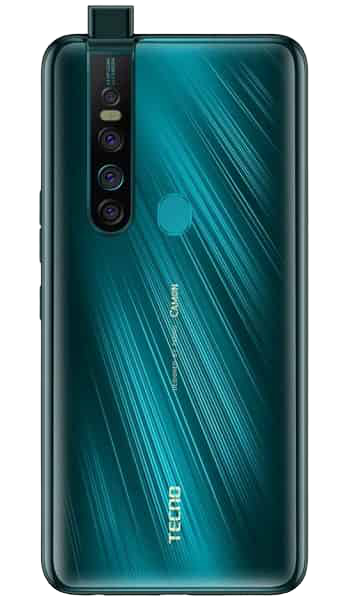
- Back of a Tecno Camon 15 Premier
- Brand: Tecno Camon
- Manufacturer: Tecno Mobile
- Type: Phablet
- Series: Camon 15
- First released: 2 April 2020; 6 years ago
- Predecessor: Tecno Camon 12
- Compatible networks: 2G, 3G, 4G, 4G LTE Other: USB 2.0; 3.5mm Headphone jack
- Form factor: Slate
- Dimensions: Camon 15 Air: 164.5 mm × 76.5 mm × 8.9 mm (6.48 in × 3.01 in × 0.35 in); Camon 15: 164 mm × 76.3 mm × 8.7 mm (6.46 in × 3.00 in × 0.34 in); Camon 15 Pro: 163.3 mm × 77.7 mm × 9 mm (6.43 in × 3.06 in × 0.35 in); Camon 15 Premier: 163.3 mm × 77.7 mm × 9 mm (6.43 in × 3.06 in × 0.35 in)
- Weight: Camon 15 Air: 196 g (6.9 oz); Camin 15: 196 g (6.9 oz); Camon 15 Pro: 203 g (7.2 oz); Camon 15 Premier: 203 g (7.2 oz)
- Operating system: Android 10 with HiOS 6.0
- System-on-chip: Camon 15 Air and Camon 15: MediaTek Helio P22; Camon 15 Pro: MediaTek Helio P35; Camon 15 Premier: MediaTek W Helio P35
- CPU: Helio: Octa-core (2.0 GHz Cortex-A53 and 4x2.35 GHz Cortex-A53, 4x1.8 GHz Cortex-A53)
- GPU: MediaTek: PowerVR GE8320
- Memory: Camon 15 Air: 3 GB RAM; Camon 15: 4 GB RAM; Camon 15 Pro and Camon 15 Premier: 6 GB RAM
- Storage: Camon 15 Air and Camon 15: 64 GB; Camon 15 Pro and Camon 15 Premier: 128 GB
- Removable storage: microSD, expandable up to 256 GB, 512 GB
- Battery: Camon 15 Air and Camon 15: 5000 mAh; Camon 15 Pro and Camon 15 Premier: 4000 mAh
- Rear camera: Camon 15 Air and Camon 15: 48 MP + 5MP (ultrawide) + 2MP macro + QVGA; Camon 15 Pro: 48 MP + 5MP (ultrawide), 115° FoV + 2MP macro, ultra night lens, f/1.79, DSP chip + QVGA; Camon 15 Premier: Sony 64 MP + 5MP (ultrawide), 115° FoV + 2MP (depth) + QVGA; All: Quad LED flash, HDR, AI scene detection, PDAF, 1080p@30fps, bokeh, panorama
- Front camera: Camon 15 Air: 8 MP, f/2.0, (wide); Camon 15: 16 MP, f/2.0; Camon 15 Pro and Camon 15 Premier: 32MP motorized pop-up; All: Dual LED flash, HDR, 1080p@30fps
- Display: 720 x 1600 720p, 1080 x 2340 1080p IPS LCD capacitive touchscreen (IPS Dot-in display for Camon 15 Air and Camon 15); Camon 15 Air: 6.6 in (164.5 mm), (266 ppi); Camon 15: 6.6 in (164.1 mm), (266 ppi); Camon 15 Pro: 6.6 in (163.3 mm), (390 ppi); Camon 15 Premier: 6.6 in (163.3 mm), (390 ppi)
- Sound: Loudspeaker
- Connectivity: Bluetooth 5.0 Wi-Fi 802.11 a/b/g/n 3G/LTE
- Data inputs: Sensors: Accelerometer; Fingerprint scanner; Magnetometer; Gyroscope; Ambient light sensor; Proximity sensor; Intelligent digital assistant; Face ID
- Model: CD6 (Camon 15 Air); CD7 (Camon 15); CC8 (Camon 15 Pro); CD8j (Camon 15 Premier)
- Website: Tecno Camon 15 Air, Camon 15, Camon 15 Pro & Camon 15 Premier

The Tecno Camon 15 Air, Tecno Camon 15, Tecno Camon 15 Pro and Tecno Camon 15 Premier are Android-based smartphones manufactured, released and marketed by the Chinese brand Tecno Mobile as part of Tecno Camon 15 series. The device were unveiled during an online event held on 2 April 2020 due to the COVID-19 pandemic as successors to Tecno Camon 12 series. It is the seventh generation of Tecno's Camon series of smartphones.

The Camon 15 Air, Camon 15, Camon 15 Pro and Camon 15 Premier are upgraded versions of the Camon 12 series, coming with different features, including the OS, storage, camera, display and battery capacity. The phones have received generally favorable reviews, with critics mostly noting the better camera setup and bigger battery. Critics, however, still criticize the lack of fast charging and missing USB Type-C port.

== Specifications ==
=== Hardware ===
The Camon 15 Air and Camon 15 feature a 720p resolution display with a 20:9 aspect ratio, while the Camon 15 Pro and Camon 15 Premier feature a 1080p resolution display with a 19.5:9 aspect ratio. All the Camon 15 series, features a display size of 6.6-inches; the Camon 15 Air and Camon 15 have IPS Dot-in display, making it the first Tecno device to come with a dot in-display front camera (punch hole) and a front LED flashlight, while the Camon 15 Pro and Camon 15 Premier feature a FHD+ display without the usual notches, making it the first Tecno device to feature such. Camon 15 Air and Camon 15 come with a MediaTek Helio P22 SoC, Camon 15 Pro comes with MediaTek Helio P35, while Camon 15 Premier comes with MediaTek W Helio P35. The Camon 15 Air comes with 3 GB of RAM, the Camon 15 comes with 4 GB of RAM, while the Camon 15 Pro and Camon 15 Premier both come with 6 GB of RAM. Camon 15 Air and Camon 15 both come with 64 GB storage, while Camon 15 Pro and Camon 15 Premier come with 128 GB storage. Camon 15 Air and Camon 15 feature the ability to use a microSD card to expand the storage to a maximum of 256 GB, while Camon 15 Pro and Camon 15 Premier can be expanded to 512 GB. The Camon 15 Air and Camon 15 come with the battery capacities of 5000 mAh, while the Camon 15 Pro and Camon 15 Premier come with the battery capacity of 4000 mAh. The cameras on the Camon 15 series improve considerably over its predecessors. The Camon 12 is equipped with three rear sensors whilst the Camon 15 has four rear sensors. The Camon 15 series comes with an LED flash and AI scene detection. The Camon 15 Pro and Camon 15 Premier come with a pop-up selfie camera, making them the first Tecno devices to come with such.

=== Software ===
All the devices ship with Android 10 with a new HiOS 6.0, unlike the versions found on Camon 12 series. The HiOS 6.0 features a system-wide Dark Theme, Social Turbo and Game mode.

== Reception ==
Dolapo Iyunade from TechCity gave the Camon 15 a score of 3.8/5, stating that the device has good battery life and large display, however, she complained of the missing USB Type-C port, but opined that it still makes for a good device.

Busayo Omotimehin from Phones Corridor praised the Camon 15 Premier design, display, battery and camera, but wished that the device had a USB Type-C port and super-fast charger out of the box.

Kenn Abuya from Techweez gave a positive review of the Camon 15, noting that the screen is big enough for consuming media content and browsing, he went further to state that the camera is a notable improvement from the Camon 12 by sheer numbers, while praising the battery capacity, but noted that the charging speed is slow due to lack of fast charging technology.

Meenu Rana from The Mobile Indian praised the Camon 15 Pro as one of the best-designed smartphones from Tecno, stressing that the camera looks impressive. He went further to express his concerns, noting that the software needs improvements.

Chetan Nayak from Boy Genius Report gave a positive review of Camon 15 Pro, stating that the device come with unique features and compromises, he went further to praise the device's pop-up camera, stressing that the device has a decent camera performance and good looks and many software-backed features. He criticized the lack of a USB Type-C port.
