= Tecno Camon 19 =

Android-based Chinese smartphones

Tecno Camon 19 Tecno Camon 19 Pro Tecno Camon 19 Pro 5G
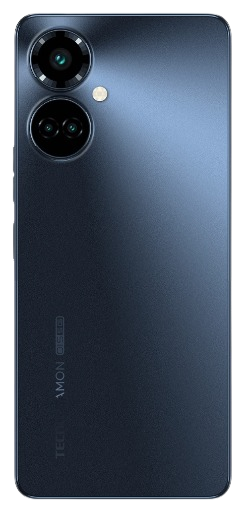
- Back of Tecno Camon 19 Pro 5G
- Brand: Tecno Camon
- Manufacturer: Tecno Mobile
- Type: Phablet
- Series: Camon 19
- First released: 28 June 2022; 4 years ago
- Predecessor: Tecno Camon 18
- Successor: Tecno Camon 20
- Compatible networks: 2G; 3G; 4G; 4G LTE; 5G
- Form factor: Slate
- Dimensions: Camon 19: 166.6 mm × 74.4 mm × 8.3 mm (6.56 in × 2.93 in × 0.33 in) Camon 19 Pro: 166.8 mm × 74.6 mm × 8.6 mm (6.57 in × 2.94 in × 0.34 in) Camon 19 Pro 5G: 166.7 mm × 74.3 mm × 8.6 mm (6.56 in × 2.93 in × 0.34 in)
- Operating system: Android 12 with HiOS 8.6
- System-on-chip: Camon 19: MediaTek Helio G85; Camon 19 Pro: MediaTek Helio G96; Camon 19 Pro 5G: MediaTek Dimensity 810
- CPU: Octa-core (2x2.0 GHz Cortex-A75 & 6x1.8 GHz Cortex-A55, Octa-core (2x2.05 GHz Cortex-A76 & 6x2.0 GHz Cortex-A55, Octa-core (2x2.4 GHz Cortex-A76 & 6x2.0 GHz Cortex-A55
- GPU: Mali-G52 MC2, Mali-G57 MC2
- Memory: Camon 19: 4 GB/6 GB RAM; Camon 19 Pro and Camon 19 Pro 5G: 8 GB RAM
- Storage: Camon 19: 128 GB; Camon 19 Pro and Camon 19 Pro 5G: 256 GB
- Removable storage: microSD
- Battery: 5000 mAh
- Charging: 18W, 33W
- Rear camera: Camon 19: 64 MP, f/1.7, 26mm (wide), 1/1.7", 0.8µm, PDAF + 2MP, f/2.4 (depth) + QVGA; Camon 19 Pro: 64 MP, f/1.6, 26mm (wide), 1/1.7", 0.8µm, PDAF, Laser AF, OIS + 50MP, f/2.0, 50mm (telephoto), 0.64µm, PDAF, 2x zoom + 2 MP, f/2.4, (depth); Camon 19 Pro 5G: 64 MP, f/1.6, 26mm (wide), 1/1.7", 0.8µm, PDAF, OIS + 2 MP, f/2.4 (macro) + 2 MP, f/2.4 (depth); All: Quad LED flash, panorama, 1080p@30fps Video: 2K@30fps, 1080p@30fps, gyro-EIS
- Front camera: Camon 19: 16 MP, f/2.0 (wide); Camon 19 Pro: 32 MP, 26mm (wide), 0.8µm; Camon 19 Pro 5G: 16 MP, f/2.0 (wide); All: Dual-LED flash, 1080p@30fps
- Display: IPS LCD capacitive touchscreen, HDR; Camon 19: 6.8 in (170 mm) 1080 × 2460 (395 ppi), 60 Hz; Camon 19 Pro: 6.8 in (170 mm) 1080 × 2460 (395 ppi), 120 Hz; Camon 19 Pro 5G: 6.8 in (170 mm) 1080 × 2460 (395 ppi), 120 Hz
- Sound: Loudspeaker; 3.5mm Headphone jack
- Connectivity: Bluetooth 5.0; Wi-Fi 802.11 b/g/n USB 2.0; USB-C; USB On-The-Go
- Data inputs: Accelerometer; Fingerprint scanner; Gyroscope; Proximity sensor; RGBW sensor; Intelligent digital assistant; Face ID
- Model: CI6 (Camon 19); CI8 (Camon 19 Pro); CI7n (Camon 19 Pro 5G)
- Website: Tecno Camon 19; Tecno Camon 19 Pro; Tecno Camon 19 Pro 5G

Tecno Camon 19, Tecno Camon 19 Pro and Tecno Camon 19 Pro 5G are Android-based smartphones manufactured, released and marketed by Tecno Mobile as part of Tecno Camon 19 series. The devices were unveiled during an event held on 28 June 2022 as successors to Tecno Camon 18 series.

The Camon 19, Camon 19 Pro and Camon 19 Pro 5G are the upgraded versions of Camon 18 series, coming with different features, including the OS, processor, display, camera and design. The phones have received generally favorable reviews, with critics mostly noting the design and the camera. Critics, however, criticized the lack of AMOLED display, 4k video support, ultrawide sensor and periscope zoom (60X).

== Specifications ==
=== Hardware ===
All the Camon 19, Camon 19 Pro and Camon 19 Pro 5G feature 1080p resolution display. These devices feature a display size of 6.8-inches. Camon 19 comes with a MediaTek Helio G85 SoC, the Camon 19 Pro comes with a MediaTek Helio G96 SoC, while the Camon 19 Pro 5G comes with a MediaTek Dimensity 810 SoC. The Camon 19 comes with two variants, consisting of 4 GB and 6 GB of RAM, while the Camon 19 Pro and Camon 19 Pro 5G come with 8 GB of RAM. Camon 19 comes with 128 GB storage, while Camon 19 Pro and Camon 19 Pro 5G comes with 256 GB storage. All of the device feature the ability to use a microSD. All the device comes with the battery capacity of 5000 mAh. The Camon 19 supports fast charging of 18 watt, while the Camon 19 Pro and Camon 19 Pro 5G support fast charging of 33 watt. Camon 19 features a dual rear camera with a 64-megapixel main camera and 2-megapixel depth camera, while it features a 16-megapixel front camera. The Camon 19 Pro features a quad camera with a 64-megapixel main camera, 50-megapixel telephoto and 2-megapixel depth camera, while it features a 32-megapixel front camera. The Camon 19 Pro 5G features a quad camera with a 64-megapixel main camera, 2-megapixel macro camera and 2-megapixel depth camera, while it features a 16-megapixel front camera.

=== Software ===
The device ship with Android 12 with HiOS 8.6 and will receive the Android 13 update. The HiOS 8.6 features Photo video, Camera pro mode, RAM extension and Smart scenes.

== Reception ==
Eugoson Quorch gave a positive review of the Camon 19 Pro. Praise was directed towards the camera, OS, RGBW sensor and design, while noting that "the Tecno Camon 19 Pro is a well designed phone and feels solid in the hand, having a very premium build".

Praiz Tech praised the Camon 19 Pro for its processor, display and camera, while noting that the design and build are excellent. However, the speakers and image stabilization quality was criticized.

Derek Tech Reviews praised the Camon 19 Pro for its camera, display, RGBW sensor, NFC feature and refresh rate while noting that the device has "a premium design". However, the lack of AMOLED display, stereo speakers, wide angle lens, 4k video support and LTPO display technology was criticized.

Izzi Boye praised the Camon 19 Pro 5G for its design, 5G connectivity, refresh rate, processor and camera. He however criticized the device for the lack of stereo speakers, telephoto camera and AMOLED display like its predecessor.
