= Tecno Spark 40C =

Entry-level LTE smartphone

Tecno Spark 40C (Tecno Pop 10 Pro)
- Also known as: Tecno Pop 10 Pro
- Brand: Tecno
- Manufacturer: Tecno Mobile
- Series: Spark
- First released: August 2025
- Colors: Ink Black, Titanium Grey, Ripple Blue, Veil White
- Dimensions: 165.6 x 77 x 8.3 mm (6.52 x 3.03 x 0.33 in)
- Weight: 188 g (6.63 oz)
- Operating system: Android 15, HiOS 15
- System-on-chip: MediaTek Helio G81
- CPU: Octa-core (2x2.0 GHz Cortex-A75 & 6x1.8 GHz Cortex-A55)
- GPU: Mali-G52 MC2
- Memory: 4 GB or 8 GB RAM
- Storage: 128 GB or 256 GB
- Removable storage: microSDXC (dedicated slot)
- Battery: 6000 mAh, non-removable
- Charging: 18W wired
- Rear camera: 13 MP, f/1.8, (wide), PDAF
- Front camera: 8 MP, (wide)
- Display: 6.67 in (169 mm) IPS LCD with 120 Hz refresh rate Resolution: 720 x 1600 pixels, 20:9 ratio (~263 ppi density)
- Sound: Dual speakers, 3.5mm jack
- Connectivity: Wi-Fi 802.11 a/b/g/n/ac, Bluetooth, GPS, NFC (market/region dependent), USB-C 2.0, Infrared port
- Data inputs: Fingerprint scanner (side-mounted), accelerometer, proximity, compass
- Water resistance: IP64 dust and water resistant

The Tecno Spark 40C (also known as Tecno Pop 10 Pro in some markets) is an entry-level Android-based smartphone that was developed and manufactured by Tecno Mobile, with IP64 splash and dust resistance. It was released on August 8, 2025, in the Philippines.

== Specifications ==
=== Hardware ===
The Tecno Spark 40C is powered by the MediaTek Helio G81 chipset, an octa-core processor built on a 12 nm process. It features a 6.67-inch IPS LCD "Hole Screen" with a resolution of 720 x 1600 pixels and a 120 Hz refresh rate, which is a high specification for its price bracket. The device is available in multiple memory configurations:

- RAM: 4GB or 8GB (with support for "Extended RAM" up to 16GB total).
- Storage: 128GB or 256GB, expandable via a microSDXC slot.

The phone is equipped with a large 6,000 mAh non-removable battery—larger than the 5,200 mAh units found in the higher-end Spark 40 models—and supports 18W fast charging.

=== Camera ===
The Spark 40C features a dual-camera setup on the rear, led by a 13 MP main sensor with an f/1.8 aperture and dual-LED flash. For selfies, it has an 8 MP front-facing camera, which also includes a dual-LED flash for low-light photography. Both cameras are capable of recording 1080p video at 30fps.

=== Design and Build ===
The device measures 165.6 x 77 x 8.4 mm and features a glass front with a plastic back and frame. It is marketed for its 1.5-meter drop resistance.

=== Software and Features ===
The Spark 40C runs on Android 15 with Tecno's custom HiOS 15.1 skin. It incorporates several "Tecno AI" features, including AI Writing (for text generation and proofreading) and AI Translate. Other notable features include a side-mounted fingerprint sensor, an infrared remote control, and dual speakers with DTS sound.
