= Tecno Spark 10 =

Android-based Chinese smartphones

Tecno Spark 10C Tecno Spark 10 Tecno Spark 10 Pro Tecno Spark 10 5G
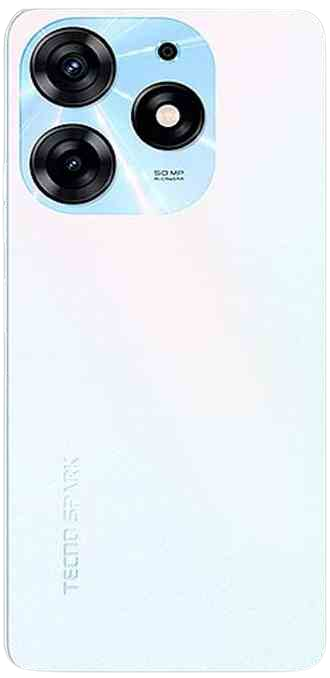
- Back of Spark 10 Pro
- Brand: Tecno Spark
- Manufacturer: Tecno Mobile
- Type: Phablet
- Series: Spark 10
- First released: 13 March 2023; 3 years ago
- Predecessor: Tecno Spark 9
- Successor: Tecno Spark 20
- Compatible networks: 2G, 3G, 4G, 5G
- Form factor: Slate
- Dimensions: Spark 10C: 163.8 mm (6.45 in) H 75.5 mm (2.97 in) W 8.5 mm (0.33 in) D; Spark 10: 163.9 mm (6.45 in) H 75.4 mm (2.97 in) W 8.4 mm (0.33 in) D; Spark 10 Pro: 168.4 mm (6.63 in) H 76.2 mm (3.00 in) W 8.4 mm (0.33 in) D; Spark 10 5G: 164.4 mm (6.47 in) H 75.5 mm (2.97 in) W 8.4 mm (0.33 in) D
- Weight: Spark 10C: 270 g (9.5 oz); Spark 10: 190 g (6.7 oz); Spark 10 Pro: 208 g (7.3 oz); Spark 10 5G: 190 g (6.7 oz)
- Operating system: Spark 10C: Android 12 with HiOS 12; Spark 10, Spark 10 Pro and Spark 10 5G: Android 13 with HiOS 12.6
- System-on-chip: Spark 10C: UNISOC T606; Spark 10: MediaTek Helio G85; Spark 10 Pro: MediaTek Helio G88; Spark 10 5G: MediaTek Dimensity 6020
- CPU: Spark 10C: Octa-core, (2×1.6 GHz Cortex-A75 & 6×1.6 GHz Cortex-A55); Spark 10 and Spark 10 Pro: Octa-core, (2×2.0 GHz Cortex-A75 & 6×1.8 GHz Cortex-A55); Spark 10 5G: Octa-core, (2×2.2 GHz Cortex-A76 & 6×2.0 GHz Cortex-A55)
- GPU: Mali-G57 MC1, Mali-G52 MC2, Mali-G57 MC2
- Memory: Spark 10C: 4/8 GB RAM; Spark 10, Spark 10 Pro, Spark 10 5G: 8 GB RAM
- Storage: Spark 10C and Spark 10: 128 GB; Spark 10 Pro: 128/256 GB; Spark 10 5G: 256 GB
- Removable storage: microSD
- SIM: nanoSIM
- Battery: 5000 mAh
- Charging: 18W
- Rear camera: Spark 10C: 16 MP; Spark 10, Spark 10 Pro and Spark 10 5G: 50 MP
- Front camera: Spark 10C, Spark 10 and Spark 10 5G: 8 MP; Spark 10 Pro: 32 MP
- Display: IPS LCD capacitive touchscreen, 720 × 1612, 1080 × 2460; Spark 10C: 6.6 in (170 mm), (267 ppi), 90 Hz refresh rate; Spark 10: 6.6 in (170 mm), (387 ppi), 90 Hz refresh rate; Spark 10 Pro: 6.8 in (170 mm), (395 ppi), 90 hz refresh rate; Spark 10 5G: 6.6 in (170 mm), (261 ppi), 90 Hz refresh rate
- Sound: 3.5mm Headphone jack
- Connectivity: Bluetooth 5.0; Wi-Fi 802.11 b/g/n USB 2.0; USB-C; USB On-The-Go
- Data inputs: Sensors: Accelerometer; Fingerprint scanner; Gyroscope; Proximity sensor; Intelligent digital assistant; Face ID
- Model: KI5k (Spark 10C); KI5q (Spark 10); KI7 (Spark 10 Pro); KI8 (Spark 10 5G)
- Website: Tecno Spark 10C; Tecno Spark 10; Tecno Spark 10 Pro

Tecno Spark 10C, Tecno Spark 10, Tecno Spark 10 Pro and Tecno Spark 10 5G are Android-based smartphones manufactured, released and marketed by Tecno Mobile as part of Tecno Spark 10 series. The devices serve as successors to Tecno Spark 9 series.

The Spark 10C, Spark 10, Spark 10 Pro and Spark 10 5G is an upgraded version of Spark 9 series, coming with different features, including the processor and design. The phone has received generally favorable reviews, with critics mostly noting the design and the display. Critics, however, criticized the lack of stereo speakers and video stabilization.

== Specifications ==
=== Hardware ===
The Spark 10C and Spark 10 feature a 720p resolution, while the Spark 10 Pro and Spark 10 5G feature a 1080p resolution. The Spark 10C, Spark 10 and Spark 10 5G phones feature a display size of 6.6-inches, while the Spark 10 Pro features a display size of 6.8-inches. The Spark 10C comes with a UNISOC T606 SoC, the Spark 10 comes with a MediaTek Helio G37 SoC, the Spark 10 Pro comes with a MediaTek Helio G88 SoC and the Spark 10 5G comes with a MediaTek Dimensity 6020 SoC. The Spark 10C comes with 4/8 GB of RAM, while the Spark 10, Spark 10 Pro and Spark 10 5G come with 8 GB of RAM. The Spark 10C and Spark 10 come with 128 GB of storage, the Spark 10 Pro comes with 128/256 GB of storage and the Spark 10 5G comes with 256 GB of storage. All of the devices feature the ability to use a microSD. All the devices come with a battery capacity of 5000 mAh, with the Spark 10, Spark 10 Pro and Spark 10 5G supporting fast charging at 18 watts. The Spark 10C features a 16-megapixel main camera, while the Spark 10, Spark 10 Pro and Spark 10 5G feature a 50-megapixel main camera. The Spark 10C, Spark 10 and Spark 10 5G feature an 8-megapixel front camera, while the Spark 10 Pro features a 32-megapixel front camera.

=== Software ===
The Spark 10C runs on Android 12 with HiOS 12, while the Spark 10, Spark 10 Pro and Spark 10 5G run on Android 13 with HiOS 12.6, different from the versions found on Spark 9 and Spark 9 Pro.

The HiOS 12 come bundled with a slew of apps like IDA Engine 3.0, Aurora Engine, Ella 2.0 and Welife, among others.

== Reception ==
Mehedi Hasan from United News of Bangladesh praised the Spark 10 Pro for its display, selfie camera and processor compared to the Spark 9 Pro, while noting that "it's refreshing to see a phone that prioritizes the needs of selfie enthusiasts".

Sern Wen from Gizmochina praised the Spark 10 Pro for being a selfie focused device while noting that the phone "doesn’t lag behind other phones in every aspect of its specs".

Nikos Papanikolopoulos from Gizchina awarded the Spark 10 Pro 8.2 stars out of 10, noting that the device is a "selfie phone for those who are on a tight budget". Praise was directed towards the display and selfie camera. However, the lack of electronic image stabilization and the sound of the video recording were criticized.

Valor Reviews praised the Spark 10 Pro for its display and design, while noting that "the build quality is great and the design is eye-catching". However, the lack of stereo speakers and video stabilization were criticized.
