= Tecno Camon 20 =

Android-based Chinese smartphones

Tecno Camon 20 Tecno Camon 20 Pro Tecno Camon 20 Pro 5G Tecno Camon 20 Premier 5G
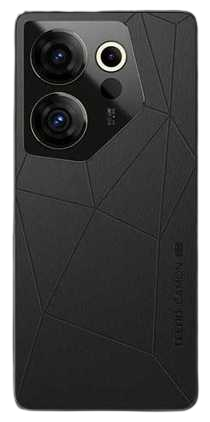
- Back of Tecno Camon 20 Premier 5G
- Brand: Tecno Camon
- Manufacturer: Tecno Mobile
- Type: Phablet
- Series: Camon 20
- First released: 9 May 2023; 3 years ago
- Predecessor: Tecno Camon 19
- Successor: Tecno Camon 30
- Compatible networks: 2G, 3G, 4G, 5G
- Form factor: Slate
- Operating system: Android 13 with HiOS 13 upgradable to Android 15 HiOS 15
- System-on-chip: Camon 20: MediaTek Helio G85; Camon 20 Pro: MediaTek Helio G99; Camon 20 Pro 5G and Camon 20 Premier 5G: MediaTek Dimensity 8050
- CPU: Camon 20: Octa-core, (2×2.0 GHz Cortex-A75 & 6×1.8 GHz Cortex-A55); Camon 20 Pro: Octa-core, (2×2.2 GHz Cortex-A76 & 6×2.0 GHz Cortex-A55); Camon 20 Pro 5G and Camon 20 Premier 5G: Octa-core, (1×3.0 GHz Cortex-A78 & 3×2.6 GHz Cortex-A78 & 4×2.0 GHz Cortex-A55)
- GPU: Mali-G52 MC2, Mali-G57 MC2, Mali-G77 MC9
- Memory: 8 GB RAM
- Storage: Camon 20, Camon 20 Pro and Camon 20 Pro 5G: 256 GB; Camon 20 Premier 5G: 512 GB
- Removable storage: microSD
- SIM: nanoSIM
- Battery: 5000 mAh
- Charging: 33W, 45W
- Rear camera: Camon 20 and Camon 20 Pro: 64 MP, f/1.7, 25mm (wide), 1/1.7", 0.8 μm, PDAF + 2MP, f/2.4 (depth) + QVGA; Camon 20 Pro 5G: 64 MP, f/1.7, (wide), 1/1.7", 0.8 μm, PDAF, OIS + 2MP, f/2.4, (macro) + 2 MP, f/2.4, (depth); Camon 20 Premier 5G: 50 MP, f/1.8, 23mm (wide), 1/1.5", 1.0 μm, PDAF, Laser AF, OIS + 108 MP, f/2.2, 13mm, 115˚ (ultrawide), PDAF + 2 MP, f/2.4 (depth); All: Ring-LED flash, panorama, 1080p@30fps Video: 4K@30fps, 1080p@30fps
- Front camera: 32 MP, f/2.5, 24mm (wide), 1/2.8", 0.8 μm All: Dual-LED flash, 1080p@30fps
- Display: AMOLED capacitive touchscreen, HDR10, 1080 × 2460; Camon 20: 6.67 in (169 mm), (403 ppi), 60 Hz refresh rate; Camon 20 Pro, Camon 20 Pro 5G and Camon 20 Premier 5G: 6.67 in (169 mm), (403 ppi), 120 Hz refresh rate
- Sound: Loudspeaker
- Connectivity: USB-C 2.0; Wi-Fi 802.11 a/b/g/n/ac, dual-band Bluetooth 5.2, A2DP, LE
- Data inputs: Sensors: Accelerometer; Fingerprint scanner; Gyroscope; Proximity sensor; RGBW sensor; Intelligent digital assistant; Face ID
- Water resistance: IP53 water/dust resistance
- Model: CK6 (Camon 20); CK7n (Camon 20 Pro); CK8n (Camon 20 Pro 5G); CK9n (Camon 20 Premier 5G)
- Website: Tecno Camon 20; Tecno Camon 20 Pro; Tecno Camon 20 Pro 5G; Tecno Camon 20 Premier 5G

Tecno Camon 20, Tecno Camon 20 Pro, Tecno Camon 20 Pro 5G and Tecno Camon 20 Premier 5G are Android-based smartphones manufactured, released and marketed by Tecno Mobile as part of Tecno Camon 20 series. The devices were unveiled during an event held on 9 May 2023 as successors to Tecno Camon 19 series.

The Camon 20, Camon 20 Pro, Camon 20 Pro 5G and Camon 20 Premier 5G is an upgraded version of Camon 19 series, coming with different features, including the OS, design and processor. The phone has received generally favorable reviews, with critics mostly noting the IP53 water/dust resistance, design and performance. Critics, however, criticized the lack of wireless charging.

== Specifications ==
=== Hardware ===
All the devices feature an AMOLED display with 1080p support and a display size of 6.67-inches. The Camon 20 comes with a MediaTek Helio G85 SoC, the Camon 20 Pro comes with a MediaTek Helio G99 SoC, while the Camon 20 Pro 5G Pro and Camon 20 Premier 5G come with a MediaTek Dimensity 8050 SoC. All the devices come with 8 GB of RAM. The Camon 20, Camon 20 Pro and Camon 20 Pro 5G come with 256 GB of storage, while the Camon 20 Premier 5G comes with 512 GB of storage. The Camon 20 Premier 5G doesn't use a microSD. All the devices come with a battery capacity of 5000 mAh, with the Camon 20, Camon 20 Pro and Camon 20 Pro 5G supporting wired charging over USB-C at up to 33W, while the Camon 20 Premier 5G has faster 45W charging. The Camon 20 and Camon 20 Pro has a 64 MP wide sensor and a 2 MP depth sensor, the Camon 20 Pro 5G has a 64 MP wide sensor, a 2 MP macro sensor and a 2 MP depth sensor, while the Camon 20 Premier 5G has a 50 MP wide sensor, a 108 MP ultrawide sensor and a 2 MP depth sensor. The front-facing camera of all the four devices uses a 32 MP sensor.

=== Software ===
The devices ship with Android 13 with HiOS 13 and will receive the Android 14 update.

== Reception ==
Valor Reviews praised the Camon 20 Premier 5G for its storage, processor and camera, while noting that "the build quality is decent and it's built with premium materials". However, the lack of corning gorilla glass protection was criticized.

Eugoson Quorch gave a positive review of the Camon 20 Pro 5G. Praise was directed towards the performance and camera, while noting that "it's a pretty solid phone" and a "sweet spot" among the Camon 20 series.

Izzi Boye praised the Camon 20 Premier 5G for its hardware, build quality and gaming performance, while noting that the addition of the "IP53 rating is a nice improvement and one less thing to nitpick". He, however, criticized the processing of the device's camera software for being inconsistent.

Cyril Okoi praised the Camon 20 Premier 5G for its processor, camera and display, while noting that the fast charging capacity at 45W "is a lot". However, the lack of wireless charging was criticized.
