= Tecno Camon 17 =

Android-based Chinese smartphones

Tecno Camon 17 Tecno Camon 17P Tecno Camon 17 Pro
- Brand: Tecno Camon
- Manufacturer: Tecno Mobile
- Type: Phablet
- Series: Camon 17
- First released: 6 May 2021; 5 years ago
- Predecessor: Tecno Camon 16
- Successor: Tecno Camon 18
- Compatible networks: 2G; 3G; 4G; 4G LTE
- Form factor: Slate
- Dimensions: Camon 17: 164.5 mm × 76.5 mm × 9 mm (6.48 in × 3.01 in × 0.35 in); Camon 17P: 168.7 mm × 76.4 mm × 8.8 mm (6.64 in × 3.01 in × 0.35 in); Camon 17 Pro: 168.9 mm × 77 mm × 9 mm (6.65 in × 3.03 in × 0.35 in)
- Operating system: Android 11 with HiOS 7.6
- System-on-chip: Camon 17 and Camon 17P: MediaTek Helio G85; Camon 17 Pro: MediaTek Helio G95
- CPU: Octa-core (2x2.0 GHz Cortex-A75 and 6x1.8 GHz Cortex-A55, Octa-core (2x2.05 GHz Cortex-A76 and 6x2.0 GHz Cortex-A55
- GPU: Mali-G52 MC2, Mali-G76 MC4
- Memory: Camon 17: 4/6 GB RAM; Camon 17P: 6 GB RAM; Camon 17 Pro: 8 GB RAM
- Storage: Camon 17 and Camon 17P: 128 GB; Camon 17 Pro: 256 GB
- Removable storage: microSD, expandable up to 256 GB
- Battery: 5000 mAh
- Charging: 18W, 25W
- Rear camera: Camon 17: 48 MP, f/2.4, (wide), PDAF + 2MP + 2MP, (depth) + QVGA + AI; Camon 17P: 64 MP, (wide), 1/2.0", 0.7µm, PDAF + 2MP, f/2.4, (macro) + 2MP, f/2.4 (depth) + AI; Camon 17 Pro: 64 MP, f/1.8, 26mm (wide), 1/2.0", 0.7µm, PDAF + 8MP, f/2.3, 119˚ (ultrawide), 1/4.0", 1.12µm + 2MP, f/2.4 (depth) + 2MP, f/2.4, (monochrome); All: Quad LED flash, HDR, panorama, 1080p@30fps
- Front camera: Camon 17: 8 MP; Camon 17P: 16 MP; Camon 17 Pro: 48 MP; All: Dual-LED flash, 1080p@30fps
- Display: 720 x 1600 720p, 1080 x 2460 1080p IPS LCD capacitive touchscreen; Camon 17: 6.6 in (164.5 mm), (266 ppi); Camon 17P: 6.8 in (164.5 mm), (395 ppi); Camon 17 Pro: 6.8 in (168.7 mm), (395 ppi)
- Sound: Loudspeaker; 3.5mm Headphone jack
- Connectivity: Bluetooth 5.0; Wi-Fi 802.11 b/g/n USB 2.0; USB-C; USB On-The-Go
- Data inputs: Accelerometer; Fingerprint scanner; Gyroscope; Proximity sensor; Intelligent digital assistant; Face ID; Step counter; Step detector
- Model: CG6 (Camon 17); CG7 (Camon 17P); CG8 (Camon 17 Pro)
- Website: Tecno Camon 17; Tecno Camon 17P; Tecno Camon 17 Pro

The Tecno Camon 17, Tecno Camon 17P and Tecno Camon 17 Pro are Android-based smartphones manufactured, released and marketed by the Chinese brand Tecno Mobile as part of Tecno Camon 17 series. The devices were unveiled during an event held on 6 May 2021 as successors to Tecno Camon 16 series.

The Camon 17, Camon 17P and Camon 17 Pro are upgraded versions of the Camon 16 series, coming with different features, including the OS, camera, design and storage. The phones have received generally favorable reviews, with critics mostly noting the bigger battery and fast charging capacity.

== Specifications ==
=== Hardware ===
The Camon 17 feature a 720p resolution display unit with a 20:9 aspect ratio, while the Camon 17P and Camon 17 Pro feature a 1080p resolution display. Camon 17 features a display size of 6.6-inches, while the Camon 17P and Camon 17 Pro feature a display size of 6.8-inches. Camon 17 and Camon17P come with a MediaTek Helio G85 SoC, while the Camon 17 Pro comes with MediaTek Helio G95 SoC. The Camon 17 comes with 4/6 GB of RAM, the Camon 17P comes with 6 GB of RAM, while the Camon 17 Pro comes with 8 GB of RAM. Camon 17 and Camon 17P come with 128 GB storage, while Camon 17 Pro comes with 256 GB storage. All of the devices feature the ability to use a microSD card to expand the storage to a maximum of 256 GB. All the devices come with the battery capacity of 5000 mAh. The Camon 17 and Camon 17P support fast charging of 18 watt, while the Camon 17 Pro supports fast charging of 25 watt. Camon 17 features a triple rear camera with a 48-megapixel main camera, 2-megapixel bokeh lens with an AI sensor, and an 8-megapixel front camera. The Camon 17P is equipped with a quad camera with a 64-megapixel main camera, 2-megapixel macro lens, 2-megapixel bokeh lens and an AI sensor, and a 16-megapixel front camera. The Camon 17 Pro features a quad rear camera with a 64-megapixel main camera, 8-megapixel wide-angle camera, 2-megapixel bokeh and 2-megapixel monochrome sensor and it also features a 48-megapixel front camera. Camon 17 Pro can shoot 4K videos at 30fps, 1080p at either 60fps or 30fps and 720p at 30fps.

=== Software ===
The device ship with Android 11 with HiOS 7.6, unlike the versions found on Camon 16 series. The HiOS 7.6 features Phone cloner, Document correction and Voice Changer.

== Reception ==
George Kamau from Techweez gave a positive review of the Camon 17 Pro. Praise was directed towards the display, software and performance, camera and battery, while noting that "TECNO really went all-in with the TECNO Camon 17 Pro". Daniel Anuoluwapelumi Moses from Dignited praised the Camon 17 camera, saying "The Camon 17 camera is really great and seem to be really useful to its users". Segun Akinleye at Techuncode awarded the phone 8 stars out of 10, noting that "The TECNO Camon 17 Pro is a good buy if you are looking for a mid-range device with a strong capacity for hectic activities. It is worth every penny, and most importantly, it packs a lot of intelligent features that can be put to use on the go".
