= Tecno Camon 18 =

Android-based Chinese smartphones

Tecno Camon 18 Tecno Camon 18P Tecno Camon 18 Premier
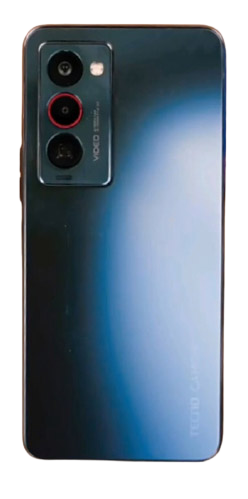
- Back of a Tecno Camon 18 Premier
- Brand: Tecno Camon
- Manufacturer: Tecno Mobile
- Type: Phablet
- Series: Camon 18
- First released: 6 October 2021; 5 years ago
- Predecessor: Tecno Camon 17
- Compatible networks: 2G; 3G; 4G; 4G LTE
- Form factor: Slate
- Dimensions: Camon 18 and Camon 18P: 168.9 mm × 76.7 mm × 8.8 mm (6.65 in × 3.02 in × 0.35 in); Camon 18 Premier: 163.8 mm × 75.9 mm × 8.2 mm (6.45 in × 2.99 in × 0.32 in)
- Operating system: Android 11 with HiOS 8.0
- System-on-chip: Camon 18: MediaTek Helio G88; Camon 18P and Camon 18 Premier: MediaTek Helio G96
- CPU: Octa-core (2x2.0 GHz Cortex-A75 & 6x1.8 GHz Cortex-A55, Octa-core (2x2.05 GHz Cortex-A76 & 6x2.0 GHz Cortex-A55
- GPU: Mali-G52 MC2, Mali-G57 MC2
- Memory: Camon 18: 4 GB RAM; Camon 18P and Camon 18 Premier: 8 GB RAM
- Storage: Camon 18 and Camon 18P: 128 GB; Camon 18 Premier: 256 GB
- Removable storage: microSD
- Battery: Camon 18 and Camon 18P: 5000 mAh; Camon 18 Premier: 4750 mAh
- Charging: 18W, 33W
- Rear camera: Camon 18: 48 MP, f/1.8, (wide), PDAF + 2MP, (macro) + 2MP, (depth); Camon 18P: 48 MP, f/1.8, 26mm, (wide), PDAF + 13MP, 45mm, (telephoto), PDAF, 1.7x optical zoom + 2MP, f/2.4 (depth); Camon 18 Premier: 64 MP, f/1.6, 26mm (wide), PDAF + 8MP, f/3.5, 135mm (periscope telephoto), PDAF, 5x optical zoom, 12 MP, (ultrawide), (gimbal OIS); All: Dual/Quad LED flash, HDR, panorama, 1080p@30fps Video: 4K@30fps, 1080p@30fps, gyro-EIS
- Front camera: Camon 18: 16 MP, (wide); Camon 18P: 16 MP, (wide); Camon 18 Premier: 32 MP, (wide); All: Dual-LED flash, 1080p@30fps
- Display: 1080 x 2460, 1080 x 2400 1080p IPS LCD capacitive touchscreen, AMOLED display; Camon 18 and Camon 18P: 6.8 in (168.9 mm), (395 ppi); Camon 18 Premier: 6.7 in (163.8 mm), (393 ppi)
- Sound: Loudspeaker; 3.5mm Headphone jack
- Connectivity: Bluetooth 5.0; Wi-Fi 802.11 b/g/n USB 2.0; USB-C; USB On-The-Go
- Data inputs: Accelerometer; Fingerprint scanner; Gyroscope; Proximity sensor; Intelligent digital assistant; Face ID
- Model: CH6 (Camon 18); CH7 (Camon 18P); CH9 (Camon 18 Premier)
- Website: Tecno Camon 18; Tecno Camon 18P; Tecno Camon 18 Premier

The Tecno Camon 18, Tecno Camon 18P and Tecno Camon 18 Premier are Android-based smartphones manufactured, released and marketed by Tecno Mobile as part of Tecno Camon 18 series. The devices were unveiled during an event held on 6 October 2021 as successors to the Tecno Camon 17 series.

The Camon 18, Camon 18P and Camon 18 Premier are the upgraded versions of the Camon 17 series, coming with different features, including the processor, display, camera, design and storage. The phones have received generally favorable reviews, with critics mostly noting the bigger battery and fast charging capacity.

== Specifications ==
=== Hardware ===
The Camon 18 and Camon 18P feature a 1080p resolution display with a 20.5:9 aspect ratio, while the Camon 18 Premier features a 1080p resolution display with a 20.9 ratio. Camon 18 and Camon 18P feature a display size of 6.8-inches, while the Camon 18 Premier features a display size of 6.7-inches. Camon 18 comes with a MediaTek Helio G88 SoC, while the Camon 18P and Camon 18 Premier come with MediaTek Helio G96 SoC. The Camon 18 comes with 4 GB of RAM, while the Camon 18P and Camon 18 Premier come with 8 GB of RAM. Camon 18 and Camon 18P come with 128 GB storage, while Camon 18 Premier comes with 256 GB storage. All of the device feature the ability to use a microSD. Camon 18 and Camon 18P come with the battery capacity of 5000 mAh, while the Camon 18 Premier comes with the battery capacity of 4750 mAh. The Camon 18 supports fast charging of 18 watt, while the Camon 18P and Camon 18 Premier support fast charging of 33 watt. Camon 18 features a dual rear camera with a 48-megapixel main camera, 2-megapixel macro and 2-megapixel depth, and it also features a 16-megapixel front camera. The Camon 18P features a quad camera with a 48-megapixel main camera, 13-megapixel telephoto and 2-megapixel depth, it features a 16-megapixel front camera. The Camon 18 Premier features a quad camera with a 64-megapixel main camera, 8-megapixel periscope telephoto camera and 12-megapixel gimbal OIS, it features a 48-megapixel front camera. Camon 18 Premier has the ability to shoot 4K videos at 30 fps and 1080p at 30 fps.

=== Software ===
The device ship with Android 11 with HiOS 8.0. The HiOS 8.0 features Za-Hooc 2.0, Voice changer, Video editor, Document correction and Phone cloner.

== Reception ==
Jbklutse.com gave a positive review of the Camon 18 Premier. Praise was directed towards the camera, performance and display, while noting that "the Tecno Camon 18 Premier is more than a decent phone of the mid-range budget with great cameras with incredible functions, an impressive display and refresh rate with lag-less gaming experience all powered by a 4750mAH battery".

George Kamau from Techweez gave a positive review of the Camon 18. He said "The TECNO Camon 18 is a really great package and nails the fundamentals – nice design, high quality and high refresh rate display, reliable performance, upgraded internals, dependable cameras, and impressive battery life".
