= Tecno Camon 30 =

Series of Android-based smartphones

Tecno Camon 30, Tecno Camon 30S Pro, Tecno Camon 30 5G, Tecno Camon 30 Pro 5G and Tecno Camon 30 Premier 5G are Android-based smartphones manufactured, released and marketed by Tecno Mobile as part of Tecno Camon 30 series. The devices were unveiled as successors to Tecno Camon 20 series.

The Camon 30 series is an upgraded version of Camon 20 series, coming with different features, including the OS, design and processor. The phones has received generally favorable reviews, with critics mostly noting the IP54 water/dust resistance, design and performance.

== Specifications ==
=== Hardware ===
As with the predecessor, all the devices feature an AMOLED display with 1080p support and a display size of 6.67-inches. Both Tecno Camon 30 Pro 5G and Camon 30 Premier 5G feature MediaTek Dimensity 8200. The Tecno Camon 30 5G features MediaTek Dimensity 7020.

=== Software ===
The devices ship with Android 14 with HiOS 14 and will receive two major Android updates.
