= Tecno Spark 20 =

Android-based Chinese smartphones

Tecno Spark 20C Tecno Spark 20 Tecno Spark 20 Pro Tecno Spark 20 Pro+ Tecno Spark 20P Tecno Spark 20 Pro 5G
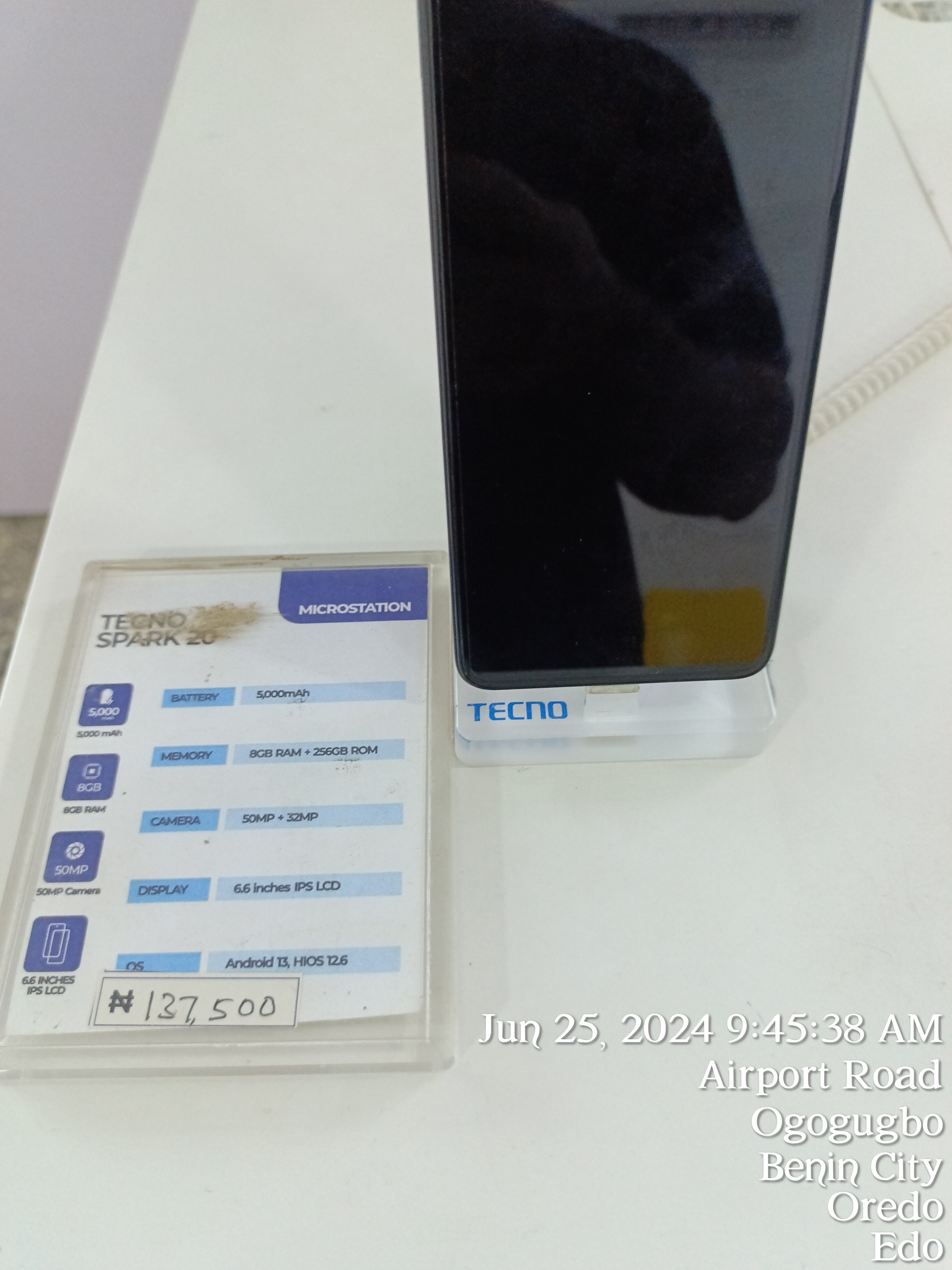
- Tecno Spark 20 series
- Brand: Tecno Spark
- Manufacturer: Tecno Mobile
- Type: Phablet
- Series: Spark 20
- First released: Spark 20C: 27 November 2023; 2 years ago Spark 20: 1 December 2023; 2 years ago Spark 20 Pro: 15 December 2023; 2 years ago Spark 20 Pro+: 29 December 2023; 2 years ago Spark 20P: 13 June 2024; 2 years ago Spark 20 Pro 5G: 17 June 2024; 2 years ago
- Availability by region: Spark 20C: 6 December 2023; 2 years ago Spark 20: 7 December 2023; 2 years ago Spark 20 Pro: 21 December 2023; 2 years ago Spark 20 Pro+: 9 February 2024; 2 years ago Spark 20P: 13 June 2024; 2 years ago Spark 20 Pro 5G: 20 June 2024; 2 years ago
- Predecessor: Tecno Spark 10
- Successor: Tecno Spark 30
- Compatible networks: 2G, 3G, 4G, 4G LTE, 5G
- Form factor: Slate
- Dimensions: Spark 20C and Spark 20P: 163.7 mm (6.44 in) H 75.6 mm (2.98 in) W 8.6 mm (0.34 in) D; Spark 20: 163.7 mm (6.44 in) H 75.6 mm (2.98 in) W 8.5 mm (0.33 in) D; Spark 20 Pro: 168.6 mm (6.64 in) H 76.6 mm (3.02 in) W 8.4 mm (0.33 in) D; Spark 20 Pro+: 164.7 mm (6.48 in) H 75 mm (3.0 in) W 7.6 mm (0.30 in) D; Spark 20 Pro 5G: 168.5 mm (6.63 in) H 76.2 mm (3.00 in) W 8.3 mm (0.33 in) D or 8.5 mm (0.33 in) D
- Weight: Spark 20C and Spark 20P: 189 g (6.7 oz); Spark 20: 194 g (6.8 oz); Spark 20 Pro: 203 g (7.2 oz); Spark 20 Pro+: 179 g (6.3 oz); Spark 20 Pro 5G: 200 g (7.1 oz) or 201.5 g (7.11 oz)
- Operating system: Spark 20C, Spark 20P, Spark 20 and Spark 20 Pro: Android 13 with HiOS 13.5; Spark 20 Pro+: Android 14 with HiOS 13.6; Spark 20 Pro 5G: Android 14 with HiOS 14
- System-on-chip: Spark 20C and Spark 20P: MediaTek Helio G36; Spark 20: MediaTek Helio G85; Spark 20 Pro: MediaTek Helio G99; Spark 20 Pro+: MediaTek Helio G99 Ultimate; Spark 20 Pro 5G: MediaTek Dimensity 6080
- CPU: Spark 20C and Spark 20P: Octa-core, (4×2.2 GHz Cortex-A53 & 4×1.8 GHz Cortex-A53); Spark 20: Octa-core, (2×2.0 GHz Cortex-A75 & 6×1.8 GHz Cortex-A55); Spark 20 Pro and Spark 20 Pro+: Octa-core, (2×2.2 GHz Cortex-A76 & 6×2.0 GHz Cortex-A55); Spark 20 Pro 5G: Octa-core, (2×2.4 GHz Cortex-A76 & 6×2.0 GHz Cortex-A55)
- GPU: Spark 20C and Spark 20P: PowerVR GE8320; Spark 20: Mali-G52 MC2; Spark 20 Pro, Spark 20 Pro+ and Spark 20 Pro 5G: Mali-G57 MC2
- Memory: Spark 20P: 4 GB RAM; Spark 20C and Spark 20: 4/8 GB RAM; Spark 20 Pro, Spark 20 Pro+ and Spark 20 Pro 5G: 8 GB RAM
- Storage: Spark 20C: 128 GB; Spark 20 and Spark 20 Pro 5G: 128/256 GB; Spark 20 Pro, Spark 20P and Spark 20 Pro+: 256 GB
- Removable storage: microSD
- SIM: nanoSIM
- Battery: 5000 mAh
- Charging: Spark 20C, Spark 20 and Spark 20P: 18W Fast Charge; Spark 20 Pro, Spark 20 Pro+ and Spark 20 Pro 5G: 33W Super Charge
- Rear camera: Spark 20C and Spark 20P: Hynix Hi-5022Q; 50 MP, f/1.8, 26mm (wide), 1/2.8", 0.64μm, PDAF 0.08 MP (depth); Spark 20: Hynix Hi-5022Q; 50 MP, f/1.6, 27mm (wide), 1/2.8", 0.64 μm, PDAF 0.08 MP (depth); Spark 20 Pro, Spark 20 Pro+ and Spark 20 Pro 5G: Samsung ISOCELL S5K(HM6); 108 MP, f/1.8, 24mm (wide), 1/1.67", 0.64 μm, PDAF 0.08 MP (depth)
- Front camera: Spark 20C, Spark 20P and Spark 20 Pro 5G: 8 MP, 1/4.0", 1.12μm; Spark 20, Spark 20 Pro and Spark 20 Pro+: Hynix Hi-3231Q or GalaxyCore GC32E1; 32 MP, f/2.2, 22mm (wide), 1/3.1", 0.7μm
- Display: IPS LCD capacitive touchscreen, AMOLED, 720 × 1612, 1080 × 2460, 1080 × 2436; Spark 20C and Spark 20P: 6.6 in (170 mm), (267 ppi), 90 Hz refresh rate; Spark 20: 6.6 in (170 mm), (267 ppi), 90 Hz refresh rate; Spark 20 Pro and Spark 20 Pro 5G: 6.78 in (172 mm), (396 ppi), 120 hz refresh rate; Spark 20 Pro+: 6.78 in (172 mm), (393 ppi), 120 Hz refresh rate
- External display: Always on
- Sound: Loudspeaker, DTS stereo, 3.5mm Headphone jack
- Connectivity: Bluetooth 5.2, A2DP, LE; Wi-Fi 802.11 a/b/g/n/ac, dual-band USB-C
- Data inputs: Sensors: Accelerometer; Fingerprint scanner; Gyroscope; Proximity sensor; Magnetometer; Intelligent digital assistant; Face ID
- Water resistance: IP53 water/dust resistance
- Model: BG7n (Spark 20C); KJ5 (Spark 20); KJ6 (Spark 20 Pro); KJ7 (Spark 20 Pro+); KJ8 (Spark 20 Pro 5G)
- Website: Tecno Spark 20C; Tecno Spark 20; Tecno Spark 20 Pro; Tecno Spark 20 Pro+ Tecno Spark 20P; Tecno Spark 20 Pro 5G

The Tecno Spark 20C, Tecno Spark 20, Tecno Spark 20 Pro, Tecno Spark 20 Pro+, Tecno Spark 20P and Tecno Spark 20 Pro 5G are Android-based smartphones manufactured, released and marketed by Tecno Mobile as part of Tecno Spark 20 series. The devices serve as successors to the Tecno Spark 10 series.

The Spark 20C, Spark 20, Spark 20 Pro, Spark 20 Pro+, Spark 20P and Spark 20 Pro 5G are an upgraded version of the Spark 10 series, with improvements to the design, processor and display. The phone has received generally favorable reviews, with critics mostly noting the camera and the design. Critics, however, criticized the lack of ultra-wide lens.

== Specifications ==
=== Hardware ===
The Spark 20C, Spark 20 and Spark 20P features a 720p resolution, while the Spark 20 Pro, Spark 20 Pro+ and Spark 20 Pro 5G features a 1080p resolution. The Spark 20C, Spark 20 and the Spark 20P phones features a display size of 6.6-inches, while the Spark 20 Pro, Spark 20 Pro+ and the Spark 20 Pro 5G features a display size of 6.78-inches. The Spark 20C and Spark 20P comes with a MediaTek Helio G36 SoC; the Spark 20 comes with a MediaTek Helio G85 SoC; the Spark 20 Pro comes with a MediaTek Helio G99 SoC; the Spark 20 Pro+ comes with a MediaTek Helio G99 Ultimate SoC; and the Spark 20 Pro 5G comes with a MediaTek Dimensity 6080.

The Spark 20P comes with 4 GB of RAM, while the Spark 20C and the Spark 20 comes with 4/8 GB of RAM, and Spark 20 Pro, Spark 20 Pro+ and Spark 20 Pro 5G comes with 8 GB of RAM. The Spark 20C comes with 128 GB of storage, the Spark 20 and Spark 20 Pro 5G comes with 128/256 GB of storage, and the Spark 20 Pro, Spark 20P and Spark 20 Pro+ comes with 256 GB of storage.

All of the devices feature the ability to use a microSD. All the devices come with a battery capacity of 5000 mAh, with the Spark 20C, Spark 20 and Spark 20P supporting fast charging at 18 watts, while the Spark 20 Pro, Spark 20 Pro+ and Spark 20 Pro 5G supports fast charging at 33 watts. The Spark 20C, Spark 20 and Spark 20P features a 50-megapixel main camera, while the Spark 20 Pro, Spark 20 Pro+ and Spark 20 Pro 5G features a 108-megapixel main camera. The Spark 20C, Spark 20 Pro 5G and Spark 20P features an 8-megapixel front camera, while the Spark 20, Spark 20 Pro and Spark 20 Pro+ features a 32-megapixel front camera.

=== Software ===
The Spark 20C and Spark 20P runs on Android 13 with HiOS 13.0, Spark 20 and Spark 20 Pro running on Android 13 with HiOS 13.5, the Spark 20 Pro+ running on Android 14 with HiOS 13.6, while the Spark 20 Pro 5G runs on Android 14 with HiOS 14.0.

The HiOS 13.5 and 14 versions come bundled with a slew of apps like memory anti-aging, memory slimming, EllaGPT and lighting multi-window, among others.

== Reception ==
Audu Baba praised the Spark 20 for its display, performance and speaker, while noting that the device is separated from the predecessor, the Spark 10, due to its "processor and improved selfie experience." However, the lack of 1080p resolution was criticized.

Salman Khan from World Affairs Insider praised the Spark 20 Pro+ for its design, IP53 rating and display, while noting that the phone "emerges as a device that seamlessly blends innovation with user-friendly features".

Ayorinde Ayodeji from Faqontech praised the Spark 20 for its selfie camera, while noting that the device "emerges as a well-rounded device, combining commendable processor performance with an upgraded camera system". However, the lack of wireless charging was criticized.

Vincenz Lee from Gadget Match praised the Spark 20 Pro+ for its display, speakers and design. However, criticism was directed at the lack of an ultra-wide lens and a more powerful chipset dedicated to 5G and gaming.
