= Tecno Spark 4 =

Android-based Chinese smartphones

Tecno Spark 4 Lite Tecno Spark 4 Air Tecno Spark 4
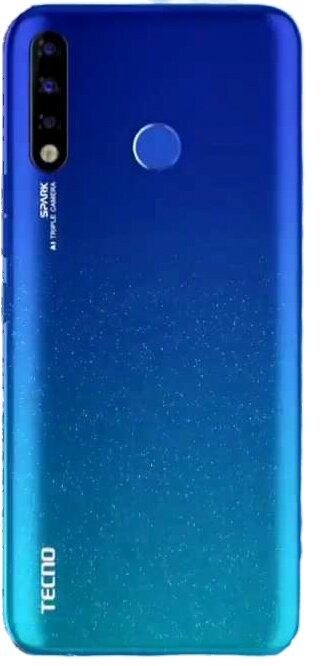
- Tecno Spark 4 back showing the triple camera
- Brand: Tecno Spark
- Manufacturer: Tecno Mobile
- Type: Phablet
- Series: Spark 4
- First released: 29 August 2019; 6 years ago
- Predecessor: Spark 3/3 Pro
- Successor: Spark 5/5 Pro
- Compatible networks: 2G; 3G; 4G; 4G LTE
- Form factor: Slate
- Dimensions: Spark 4 Lite: 166.7 mm × 75.8 mm × 8.4 mm (6.56 in × 2.98 in × 0.33 in); Spark 4 Air: 156.1 mm × 75.0 mm × 9.2 mm (6.15 in × 2.95 in × 0.36 in); Spark 4: 165.28 mm × 75.9 mm × 8.2 mm (6.507 in × 2.988 in × 0.323 in)
- Weight: Spark 4 Lite: 176 g (6.2 oz); Spark 4 Air: 168 g (5.9 oz); Spark 4: 176 g (6.2 oz)
- Operating system: Android 10 with HiOS 6.2.0
- System-on-chip: MediaTek Helio A22
- CPU: Helio: Quad-core (4x 2.0 GHz ARM Cortex-A53, 4x 1.8 GHz ARM Cortex-A53)
- GPU: MediaTek: PowerVR GE8320
- Memory: 2 GB RAM
- Storage: 32 GB
- Removable storage: microSD, expandable up to 128 GB
- Battery: Spark 4 Lite: 4000 mAh; Spark 4 Air: 3000 mAh; Spark 4: 4000 mAh
- Rear camera: Spark 4 Lite: 8MP PDAF Spark 4 Air: 13MP PDAF + 2MP Dual Camera Spark 4: 13 MP PDAF + 2MP + Low-light Sensor Triple Camera
- Front camera: Spark 4 Lite: 8MP Front Camera Spark 4 Air: 5MP Front Camera Spark 4: 8MP Front Camera
- Display: 720 x 1600 720p (HDR10 for Spark 4) Dot Notch IPS LCD; Spark 4 Lite: 6.52 in (166.7 mm), (269 ppi); Spark 4 Air: 6.1 in (156.1 mm), (273 ppi); Spark 4: 6.52 in (165.28 mm), (269 ppi)
- External display: (Always On for Spark 4)
- Sound: Loudspeaker; 3.5mm Headphone jack
- Connectivity: Bluetooth 5.0; Wi-Fi 802.11 a/b/g/n USB 2.0
- Data inputs: Accelerometer; Fingerprint scanner; Magnetometer; Ambient light sensor; Proximity sensor; Intelligent digital assistant; Face ID
- Model: BB4k (Spark 4 Lite); KC6 (Spark 4 Air); KC8 (Spark 4)
- Website: Spark 4 Lite; Spark 4 Air; Spark 4

Tecno Spark 4 Lite, Tecno Spark 4 Air and Tecno Spark 4 are Android-based smartphones manufactured, released and marketed by the Chinese company Tecno Mobile as part of Tecno Spark 4 series. The device were unveiled as successors to Tecno Spark 3 and Tecno Spark 3 Pro. It is the fourth generation of Tecno's Spark series of smartphones.

The Spark 4 Lite, Spark 4 Air and Spark 4 are the upgraded versions of Spark 3 batch, coming with the same OS, RAM and GPU, but with different UI and battery capacity.

The phone has received generally favorable reviews, with critics mostly noting the larger battery, larger display, triple cameras and the faiba support. Reviewers, however, still criticize the lack of full HD display, software update, fast charging and missing USB Type-C port.

== Specifications ==
=== Hardware ===
The Spark 4 Lite, Spark 4 Air and Spark 4 all feature a 720p resolution. The Spark 4 Lite and Spark 4 come with an 20:9 aspect ratio, while the Spark 4 Air comes with an 19.5:9 aspect ratio; the Spark 4 Lite and Spark 4 have 6.52-inch Dot Notch IPS LCD, on the contrary, the Spark 4 Air has 6.1-inch Dot Notch IPS LCD. The Spark 4 comes with Always On display (AOD) and HDR10.

All the devices come with a MediaTek Helio A22 SoC and 2 GB of RAM.

The Spark 4 Lite, Spark 4 Air and Spark 4 all come with 32 GB storage. They all feature the ability to use a microSD card to expand the storage to a maximum of 128 GB.

The Spark 4 Lite and Spark 4 come with the battery capacities of 4000 mAh, while the Spark 4 Air comes with the battery capacity of 3000 mAh.

The Spark 4 series features an improved camera and improved display. The Spark 4 comes with three lenses, a 13 MP shooter, a 2 MP shooter and a VGA lens.

=== Software ===
All the devices ship with Android 9.0 "Pie" with a new HiOS 5.5, different from the versions found on Spark 3 and Spark 3 Pro.

The HiOS 5.5 comes with an AR virtual canvas, gesture call picker, game mode, game assistant, closed eye detection and fingerprint reset password.

== Reception ==
Dickson Otieno from Tech-ish gave the Spark 4 a score of 3.6/5, praising the design, but stated that it's boring, copying the same design every time. However, he noted that the battery is a good upgrade from Spark 3 Pro.

George Kamau from Techweez noted that Spark 4 looks good as a budget phone, but concluded that the device fails in the competitive budget smartphones market.

Usama Anjum from Phone World praised the Spark 4 design and the triple rear camera. He opined that the features is okay for a budget smartphone.

Anfernee Onamu from Gadgets Africa praised Spark 4 for its screen, battery life and fun features, but opined that the device has a low-quality camera.

Nixon Kanali from Tech Trends KE praised the overall design of Spark 4, stating that it's easy to use and handle. He went further to praise the device's support for Faiba and its battery performance.

Kevin Kimani from Mobi Trends praised the Spark 4 for its display, camera and battery, but noted that the charging speed is slow due to lack of fast charging technology.
