= Tecno Pova 6 Pro =

Android-based Chinese smartphone

- Brand: Tecno
- Type: Smartphone
- First released: 2024, April 04
- Predecessor: Tecno Pova 5 Pro
- Weight: 195 g (7 oz)
- Operating system: Android 14, HIOS 14
- CPU: Octa-core (2x2.4 GHz Cortex-A76 & 6x2.0 GHz Cortex-A55)
- GPU: Mali-G57 MC2
- Memory: 8GB, 12GB
- Storage: 256GB
- Removable storage: microSDXC
- SIM: Dual SIM (Nano-SIM, dual stand-by)
- Battery: 6000 mAh, non-removable
- Charging: 70W wired
- Rear camera: 108 MP
- Front camera: 32 MP

The Tecno Pova 6 Pro is an Android-based smartphone manufactured by Chinese company Tecno. It was announced on 26 February and released on 4 April 2024. It is the successor of the Tecno Pova 5 Pro.

== Specifications ==
=== Design ===
The Tecno Pova 6 Pro has a glass front while its back and frame are made of plastic. It comes in two color variants: Comet Green and Meteorite Grey. The device has an IP53 rating, which means it is splash and dust resistant. The device measures 165.5 x 76.1 x 7.9 mm and weighs 195 g. It supports dual SIM (Nano-SIM and dual stand-by).

=== Display ===
It features a 6.78-inch AMOLED display with a resolution of 1080 x 2436 pixels and a pixel density of 393 ppi. It has a peak brightness of 1300 nits. The display also has an under-display optical fingerprint scanner and a punch-hole cutout for the selfie camera.

=== Hardware ===
The Tecno Pova 6 Pro is powered by the Mediatek Dimensity 6080 chipset, which is based on a 6 nm process and has an octa-core CPU and a Mali-G57 MC2 GPU. The device has 8 GB or 12 GB of RAM and 256 GB of internal storage. The storage is based on UFS 2.2. The device does have a microSD card slot.

=== Camera ===
It has a dual camera setup on the back and a single camera on the front. The main camera is a 108 MP sensor while the front camera is a 32 MP sensor.

=== Battery ===
The device has a non-removable 6000 mAh battery that supports 70W wired charging. The device can be charged from 1% to 100% in less than 60 minutes.

=== Software ===
The divide runs on Android 14 with HIOS 14 as the custom user interface.

== Critical reviews ==
GSMarena gave it 4.1 stars out of 5 and praised its display and battery life. NotebookCheck gave it 84 out of 100 and praised its design, performance and battery life. Slash Gear gave the device 7 out of 10; while camera, build quality and low price as praised, its processing power and bloatware were said to be its weak points. Android Headlines gave it 4 out 5; while its gaming performance, heat management, outdoor visibility were praised, speakers and general performance were said to be mediocre.
