= Tecno Spark 8 =

Android-based Chinese smartphones

Tecno Spark 8 Tecno Spark 8P
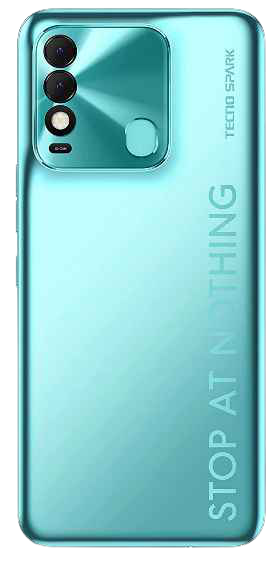
- Back of Tecno Spark 8
- Brand: Tecno Spark
- Manufacturer: Tecno Mobile
- Type: Phablet
- Series: Spark 8
- First released: August 2021; 4 years ago
- Predecessor: Tecno Spark 7
- Compatible networks: 2G, 3G, 4G, 4G LTE
- Form factor: Slate
- Dimensions: Spark 8: 164.8 mm × 76.1 mm × 9.2 mm (6.49 in × 3.00 in × 0.36 in); Spark 8P: 164.5 mm × 76.1 mm × 8.9 mm (6.48 in × 3.00 in × 0.35 in)
- Operating system: Android 11 with HiOS 7.6
- System-on-chip: Spark 8: MediaTek Helio P22; Spark 8P: MediaTek Helio G35
- CPU: Octa-core (4x1.8 GHz Cortex-A53 & 4x1.5 GHz Cortex-A53), Octa-core (4x2.3 GHz Cortex-A53 & 4x1.8 GHz Cortex-A53)
- GPU: PowerVR GE8320
- Memory: Spark 8: 2 GB RAM; Spark 8P: 4 GB RAM
- Storage: Spark 8: 64 GB; Spark 8P: 64/128 GB
- Removable storage: microSD
- SIM: nanoSIM
- Battery: 5000 mAh
- Charging: 10W
- Rear camera: Spark 8: 16 MP, f/1.8, 27mm (wide), PDAF + 2MP, (depth); Spark 8P: 50 MP, f/1.6, PDAF + 2MP, f/2.4 + QVGA; All: Quad LED flash, HDR, panorama, 1080p@30fps Video: 1080p@30fps
- Front camera: 8MP All: Dual-LED flash, 1080p@30fps
- Display: 720 x 1600 720p, 1080 x 2408 1080p IPS LCD capacitive touchscreen; Spark 8: 6.52 in (164.8 mm), (269 ppi); Spark 8P: 6.6 in (164.5 mm), (387 ppi)
- Sound: DTS stereo 3.5mm Headphone jack
- Connectivity: Bluetooth 5.0; Wi-Fi 802.11 b/g/n USB 2.0; USB-C; USB On-The-Go
- Data inputs: Sensors: Accelerometer; Fingerprint scanner; Gyroscope; Proximity sensor; Intelligent digital assistant; Face ID
- Model: KG6 (Spark 8); KG7h (Spark 8P)
- Website: Tecno Spark 8 Tecno Spark 8P

Tecno Spark 8 and Tecno Spark 8P are Android-based smartphones manufactured, released and marketed by Tecno Mobile as part of Tecno Spark 8 series. The devices serve as successors to Tecno Spark 7 series.

The Spark 8 and Spark 8P is an upgraded version of Spark 7 series, coming with different features, including the processor, camera and design. The phone has received generally favorable reviews, with critics mostly noting the design and the camera. Critics, however, criticized the lack of fast charging capacity.

== Specifications ==
=== Hardware ===
The Spark 8 feature a 720p resolution with an 20:9 aspect ratio, while the Spark 8P feature a 1080p resolution with an 20:9 aspect ratio. Spark 8 feature a display size of 6.52-inches, while the Spark 8P feature a display size of 6.6-inches. Spark 8 comes with a MediaTek Helio P22 SoC, while the Spark 8P comes with a MediaTek Helio G35 SoC. The Spark 8 comes with 2 GB of RAM, while the Spark 8P comes with 4 GB of RAM. Spark 8 comes with 64 GB storage, while Spark 8P comes with 64/128 GB storage. All of the device feature the ability to use a microSD. Both devices come with a battery capacity of 5000 mAh, while supporting the charging of 10 watt. Spark 8 feature a dual rear camera with a 16-megapixel main camera and 2-megapixel depth, it feature an 8-megapixel front camera. The Spark 8P feature a dual rear camera with a 50-megapixel main camera, it feature an 8-megapixel front camera.

=== Software ===
The Spark 8 runs on Android 11 (Go edition), while the Spark 8P runs on the standard Android 11, with both running on HiOS 7.6. The HiOS 7.6 features Peek Proof, Voice Changer, Phone cloner and Document correction.

== Reception ==
Cashify praised the Spark 8 for its battery, display and DTS sound effect while noting that the device has "an excellent design". However, the lack of fast charging capacity and 5G connectivity were criticized.

Stephen Ekpa from DroidAfrica praised the Spark 8 for its design and performance. He however criticized the device's sound quality, while noting that "the speaker is economically integrated with the earpiece grill".

Alfred Gitonga from Mobi Trends praised the Spark 8P for its display, design and camera, while noting that "camera-wise, the Spark 8P is a major improvement and is definitely the unique selling proposition of the smartphone".

Yinkmedia gave a positive review of the Spark 8P. Praise was directed towards the battery, design, display and camera, while noting that "the selfie camera needs improvement".
