= Tecno Camon 50 =

Mid-range Android smartphones released in 2026

Tecno Camon 50 Tecno Camon 50 Pro
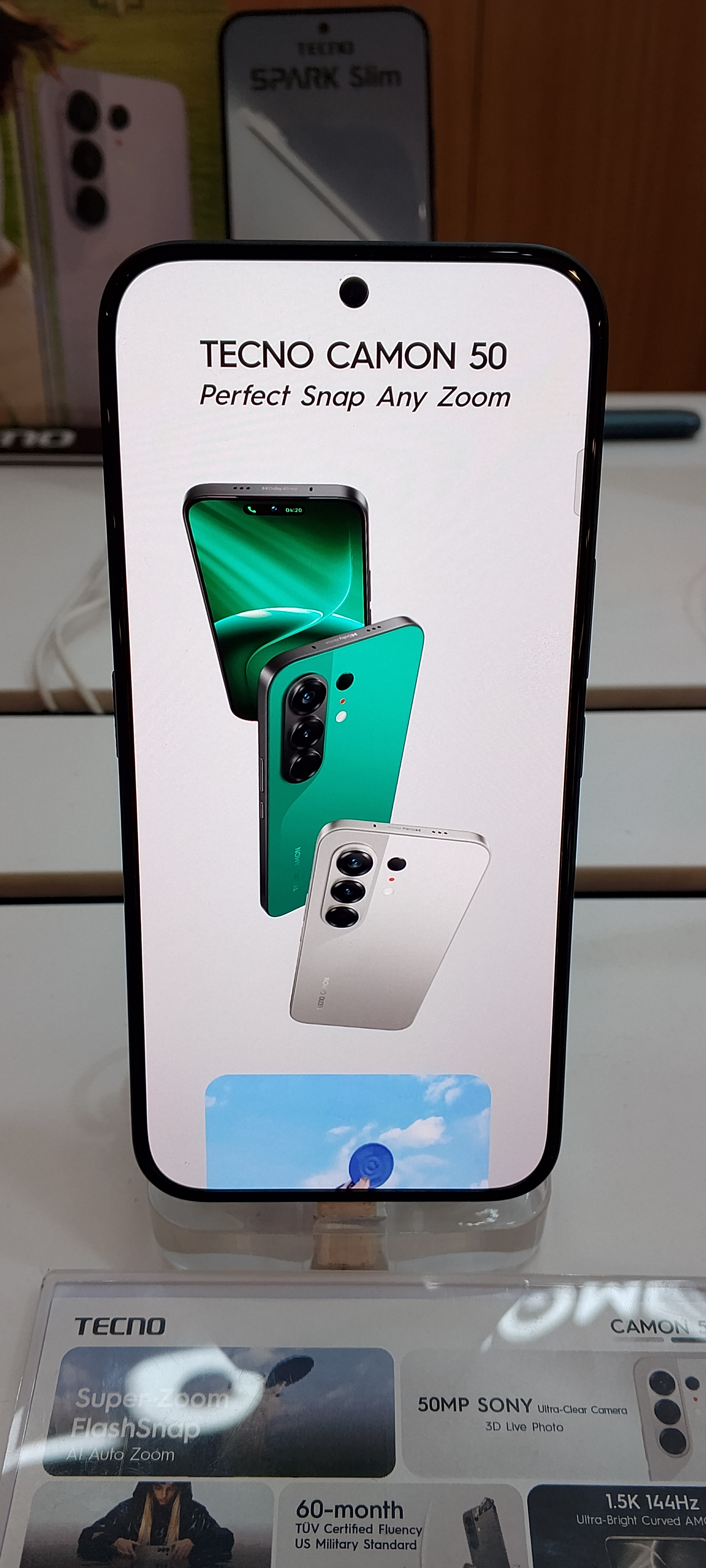
- Front panel view of the Tecno Camon 50
- Brand: Tecno
- Manufacturer: Tecno Mobile
- Type: Smartphone
- Series: Tecno Camon
- First released: February 17, 2026
- Predecessor: Tecno Camon 40 series
- Related: Tecno Camon 50 Pro / Ultra
- Compatible networks: GSM, HSPA, LTE
- Form factor: Slate
- Colors: Moonshadow Black; Nebula Titanium; Malachite Green; Fir Green; Lavender Mist; Cream Mint; Ethereal Blue (Pro)
- Dimensions: Camon 50: 162.37 × 77.17 × 7.53 mm Camon 50 Pro: 162.37 × 76.97 × 7.38 mm
- Weight: Camon 50 Pro: 178 g (6.3 oz)
- Operating system: Android 16 with HiOS 16
- System-on-chip: MediaTek Helio G200 Ultimate (6 nm)
- CPU: Octa-core (2x2.2 GHz Cortex-A76 & 6x2.0 GHz Cortex-A55)
- GPU: Mali-G57 MC2
- Memory: 8 GB or 12 GB RAM
- Storage: 128 GB or 256 GB
- SIM: Nano-SIM (Dual SIM, dual stand-by)
- Battery: 6150 mAh or 6500 mAh (non-removable)
- Charging: 45W wired Super Charge
- Rear camera: Both models: 50 MP Sony LYTIA 700C "Night Camera), f/1.8 (wide), OIS; 8 MP, f/2.2 (ultrawide), AF; Camon 50 Pro: 50 MP, f/2.4 (telephoto), 3x optical zoom, OIS
- Front camera: 32 MP, f/2.5 (wide)
- Display: 6.78 in (172 mm) 1.5K AMOLED, 144Hz refresh rate Resolution: 1208 x 2644 pixels (19.5:9 ratio)
- Water resistance: IP68/IP69/IP69K
- Model: CN5 (Camon 50) / CN7c (Camon 50 Pro)
- Website: www.tecno-mobile.com/phones/product-detail/product/camon-50 www.tecno-mobile.com/ke/phones/product-detail/product/camon-50-pro

The Tecno Camon 50 and Camon 50 Pro (4G) are mid-range Android-based smartphones designed, manufactured, and marketed by Tecno Mobile as part of the Tecno Camon series. As a successor to the Camon 40 series, it was unveiled on February 17, 2026 and showcased at the MWC exhibit in Barcelona, Spain.

On April 18, 2026, the Camon 50 alongside Camon 50 Ultra was launched in Philippine markets.

== Design ==
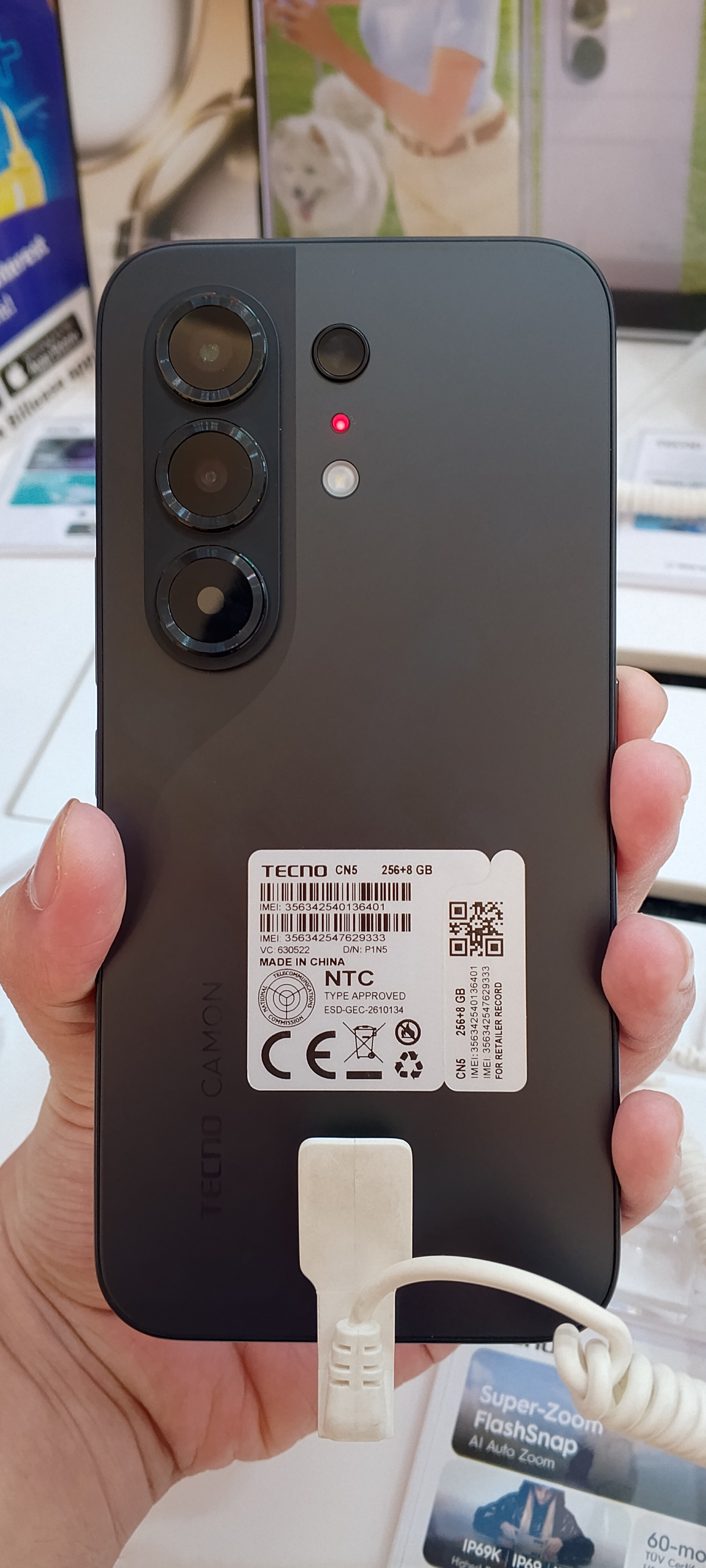
Rear panel view

The TECNO Camon 50 series utilizes a "swan-inspired elegance" design philosophy that yields distinct builds for both the base and Pro models. The standard Camon 50 features a lightweight straight screen configuration, while the Camon 50 Pro adopts a 43.5-degree slightly curved display intended to maximize hand comfort.

Both devices carry extreme environmental protection metrics, featuring IP68, IP69, and IP69K certifications for dust, splash-resistance, and high-pressure jet resistance alongside MIL-STD-810 military-grade shock drop compliance.

Available colors across the lineup include Moonshadow Black, Nebula Titanium, Malachite Green, Fir Green, Lavender Mist, Cream Mint and Ethereal Blue. The Ethereal Blue colorway is only available for the Pro model.

== Technical specifications ==
=== Display ===
Both models were equipped by an AMOLED display. It has a size of 6.78 inches, a referesh rate of 144 Hz, a resolution of 1208 × 2644 pixels, a ratio of 19.5:9, and a pixel density of 429 ppi. It also support HDR imaging.

=== Hardware and memory ===
Both models were paired by a built-in 6 mm Mediatek Helio G200 Ultimate chipset integrated with an octa-core (2× 2.2 GHz Cortex-A76 cores and 6× 2.0 GHz Cortex-A55 cores) and a Mali-G57 MC2 graphics processor.

Also, it has a memory configuration of either a 128GB + 8GB RAM, 256GB + 8GB RAM, or a 256GB + 12GB RAM. The Pro version only comes with a 256GB internal storage and an 8GB RAM.

=== Battery ===
All deviced were housed by a 6150 mAh non-removable battery. Both variants received 45W Super Charge technology engineered to survive up to 1,800 charge cycles before dropping below 80% original capacity.

=== Cameras ===
In the rear, the camera island layout consists for the following models:

Camera specifications
Specification		Camon 50	Camon 50 Pro
Layout		Dual	Triple
Resolution (in megapxels)	Primary	50 MP Sony LYTIA 700C, f/1.8, 1/1.56" with OIS	
Resolution (in megapxels)	Ultrawide	8 MP ultrawide-angle (112°), focal length: 14 mm, f/2.2	
Resolution (in megapxels)	Telephoto	no telephoto lens	50 MP telephoto, f/2.4 with 3x optical zoom and OIS
Maximum zooming			AI 60x superzoom mode
Other features		Advanced Flash System and Flicker Sensor	
Video: 1080p @ 30 FPS

Both models were equipped by a front-facing 32 MP (wide) with an aperture of f/2.5.

=== Software ===
Both devices run on Android 16 with HiOS 16 user interface. The software provides an upgraded "Dynamic Port", alongside an "iPhone One-tap Drop"-supported NFC system. Tecno announced that the devices will get 3 major Android updates.
