= Tecno Camon 12 =

Android-based Chinese smartphones

Tecno Camon 12 Air Tecno Camon 12 Tecno Camon 12 Pro
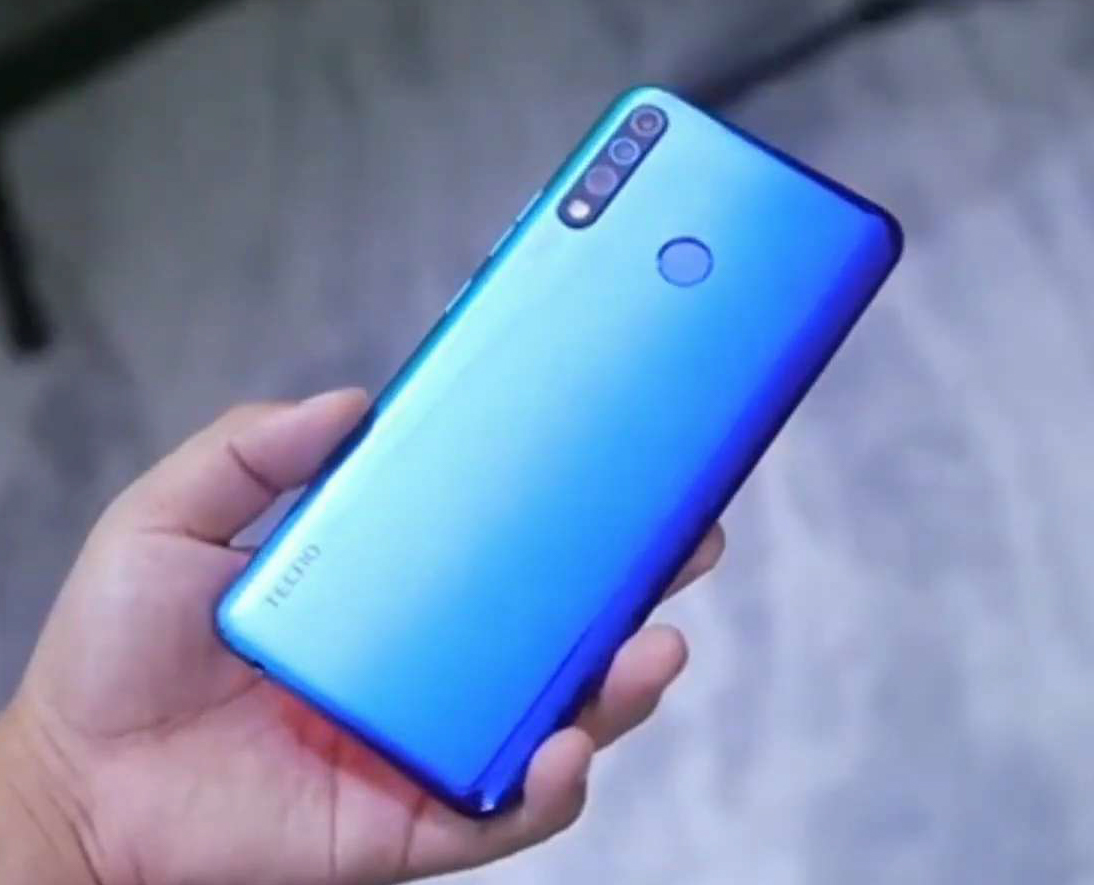
- Back of a Tecno Camon 12 Air showing the triple rear camera with quad flash
- Brand: Tecno Camon
- Manufacturer: Tecno Mobile
- Type: Phablet
- Series: Camon 12
- First released: 5 September 2019; 7 years ago
- Predecessor: Camon 11/11 Pro
- Form factor: Slate
- Dimensions: Camon 12 Air: 164.2 mm × 76.1 mm × 8.2 mm (6.46 in × 3.00 in × 0.32 in); Camon 12: 166 mm × 75.8 mm × 8.2 mm (6.54 in × 2.98 in × 0.32 in); Camon 12 Pro: 158.6 mm × 75.5 mm × 7.8 mm (6.24 in × 2.97 in × 0.31 in)
- Weight: Camon 12 Air: 181 g (6.4 oz); Camon 12: 170.7 g (6.02 oz); Camon 12 Pro: 161 g (5.7 oz)
- Operating system: Android 9.0 "Pie" with HiOS 5.5
- System-on-chip: MediaTek Helio P22 (MediaTek Helio A22 for Camon 12 Air African version)
- CPU: Helio: Octa-core (Quad-core for Camon 12 Air African version) (4x 2.0 GHz ARM Cortex-A53, 4x 1.5 GHz ARM Cortex-A53)
- GPU: MediaTek: PowerVR GE8320
- Memory: Camon 12 Air: 3/4 GB RAM; Camon 12: 4 GB RAM; Camon 12 Pro: 6 GB RAM
- Storage: Camon 12 Air: 32/64 GB; Camon 12 and Camon 12 Pro: 64 GB
- Removable storage: microSD, expandable up to 256 GB
- Battery: Camon 12 Air and Camon 12: 4000 mAh; Camon 12 Pro: 3500 mAh
- Rear camera: Camon 12 Air: 16MP PDAF + 5MP + 2MP; Camon 12 and Camon 12 Pro: 16MP PDAF + 8MP + 2MP
- Front camera: Camon 12 Air: 8MP; Camon 12: 16MP; Camon 12 Pro: 32MP
- Display: 720 x 1600 720p (IPS Dot-in display for Camon 12 Air) (IPS Infinity-V display for Camon 12) (AMOLED Infinity-U display for Camon 12 Pro); Camon 12 Air: 6.55 in (164.2 mm), (268 ppi); Camon 12: 6.52 in (166 mm), (269 ppi); Camon 12 Pro: 6.4 in (158.6 mm), (266 ppi)
- Sound: Loudspeaker
- Connectivity: Bluetooth 5.0 Wi-Fi 802.11 a/b/g/n 3G/LTE
- Data inputs: Sensors: Accelerometer; Fingerprint scanner; Magnetometer; Gyroscope; Ambient light sensor; Proximity sensor; Intelligent digital assistant; Face ID; Compatible Networks = 2G, 3G, 4G, 4G LTE; Other: USB 2.0; 3.5mm Headphone jack
- Model: CC6 (Camon 12 Air); CC7 (Camon 12); CC9 (Camon 12 Pro)
- Website: Tecno Camon 12 Air, Camon 12 & Camon 12 Pro

The Tecno Camon 12 Air, Tecno Camon 12, and Tecno Camon 12 Pro are Android-based smartphones manufactured, released, and marketed by the Chinese company Tecno Mobile as part of Tecno Camon 12 series. The device were unveiled during an event held on 5 September 2019 in Lagos, Nigeria, as successors to Tecno Camon 11 and Tecno Camon 11 Pro. It is the sixth generation of Tecno's Camon series of smartphones.

The Camon 12 Air, Camon 12, and Camon 12 Pro batch are an upgraded version of Camon 11 batch, coming with the same CPU. These phones generally come with different features, including the OS, RAM, display size, aspect ratio, and battery capacity.

The Camon 12 Pro has received generally favorable reviews, with critics mostly noting the good camera, shooting functions, storage capacity, build quality, and the in-display fingerprint sensor scanner. Critics, however, still criticize the lack of software update, full HD display, fast charging, and USB Type-C port.

== Specifications ==
=== Hardware ===
The Camon 12 Air, Camon 12 and Camon 12 Pro all feature a 720p resolution display with a 20:9 aspect ratio; the Camon 12 Air has 6.55-inch IPS Dot-in display, making it the first Tecno device to come with a dot in-display front camera (punch hole), the Camon 12 has 6.52 inches IPS Infinity-V display, while the Camon 12 Pro has 6.4-inch AMOLED Infinity-U display, looking so identical like the Tecno Phantom 9.

All the devices come with a MediaTek Helio P22 SoC, except the African version of Camon 12 Air that comes with MediaTek Helio A22.

The Camon 12 Air has two versions, the African version comes with 3 GB of RAM, while the Asian version comes with 4 GB of RAM. The Camon 12 comes with 4 GB of RAM, while the Camon 12 Pro comes with 6 GB of RAM.

The African version of Camon 12 Air comes with 32 GB storage, while the Asian version comes with 64 GB storage. Both the Camon 12 and Camon 12 Pro come with 64 GB storage. They all feature the ability to use a microSD card to expand the storage to a maximum of 256 GB.

The Camon 12 Air and Camon 12 come with the battery capacities of 4000 mAh, while the Camon 12 Pro comes with the battery capacity of 3500 mAh.

The Camon 12 series come with an upgraded camera, an ultra clear shot, 120° super wide angle, 2 cm extreme macro photography and bokeh effect.

The Camon 12 Pro comes with higher-res front camera, under-the-display fingerprint reader, AMOLED display and a Google Assistant button, unlike the Camon 12 Air and Camon 12.

=== Software ===
All the devices ship with Android 9.0 "Pie" with a new HiOS 5.5, unlike the versions found on Camon 11 and Camon 11 Pro.

The HiOS 5.5 comes with an AR virtual canvas, gesture call picker, game mode, game assistant, closed eye detection and fingerprint reset password.

== Reception ==
Victor Oloo from Dignited gave the Camon 12 a score of 8/10, describing the performance as decent and praising the camera and the battery. However, he noted that the device is a good upgrade on the Camon 11.

Saruni Maina from Gadgets Africa praised its performance, camera, size, and looks but criticized that it takes too long to charge. He went further to state that it scratches way too easily, and it's a boring phone. In his opinion, the software of the phone is bad while the Camon 12 Pro and Camon 12 Air are better alternatives.

Remmegious Ssewankambo from Techjaja gave the Camon 12 a score of 3.7/5, stating that it stands up pretty well to its promise but not without shortcomings. He, however, noted that even though it has a plastic design here and there, with a low-res display, it's still a worthwhile upgrade from the Camon 11.

Dickson Otieno from Tech-ish rated the Camon 12 3.5/5 for its beautiful design, display quality, and the overall feel on the hand. He, too, says that the software needs to be improved.

Dolapo Iyunade from TechCity gave the Camon 12 a score of 7.6/10, stating that the camera really stands out. She opined further that the device packages high-end features, even though it sells for a lower price.

Udoka Chiefe of Techpoint praised the Camon 12 Pro for its selfie camera and 6GB of RAM, stating that the RAM helps the device navigate smoothly. She praised the memory, speakers and battery, but criticized the security of the device and the many ads on the phone, stating that it leaves a lot to be desired.

== Gallery ==
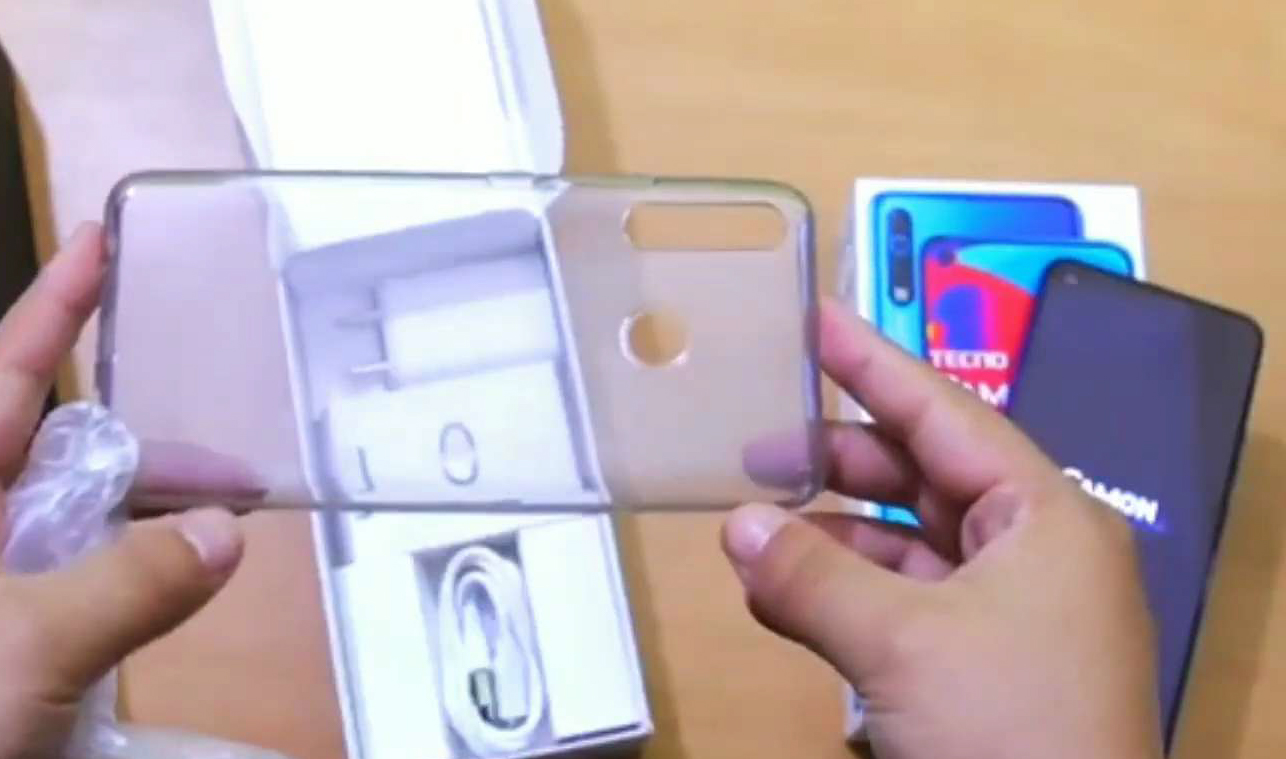
The Camon 12 Air packaging
