= Tecno Mobile =

Smartphone manufacturer based in Hong Kong

TECNO Mobile Limited
- Trade name: TECNO
- Type: Subsidiary
- Industry: Consumer electronics
- Founded: 2006; 20 years ago in Hong Kong
- Founder: George Zhu
- Headquarters: New Territories, Hong Kong (registered office); Shenzhen, China (Operational headquarters)
- Area served: Worldwide
- Key people: George Zhu (founder & CEO)
- Products: Mobile phones, tablets, routers, accessories
- Revenue: ▲US$1 billion (2020)
- Number of employees: 1000+
- Parent: Transsion Holdings
- Website: tecno-mobile.com

TECNO is a Hong Kong-based Chinese smartphone manufacturer. It was established in 2006. It is a subsidiary of Transsion Holdings.

Aimed at emerging markets, Tecno has mainly focused its business on Africa, Asia, Latin America, and Eastern Europe.

Its operating system, branded as HiOS, as of 2026, remains closed source.

== History ==
In 2006, TECNO was founded as Tecno Telecom Limited, but later changed its name to Transsion Holdings with TECNO serving as one of its subsidiaries. In 2007, Tecno created a second brand, Itel that sold in Africa. In early 2008, Tecno focused entirely to Africa following market research, and by 2010, it was among the top three mobile phone brands in Africa.

Tecno entered the Middle East mobile phone market in 2016, and entered India, Bangladesh and Nepal markets in 2017, with trial sales in Pakistan also starting that year.

The TECNO phones sold in India are assembled in their manufacturing facility in Noida, Uttar Pradesh.

Tecno collaborated with the University of Leeds School of Design on developing an accurate way to capture diverse skin tones in camera images, using a combination of spectral data and AI-powered algorithms to improve skin tone rendering in smartphone photography.

In 2024, TECNO developed a tri-foldable phone concept.

TECNO maintains a customized Android operating system called HiOS, it is used in the company's smartphones.

== List of products ==
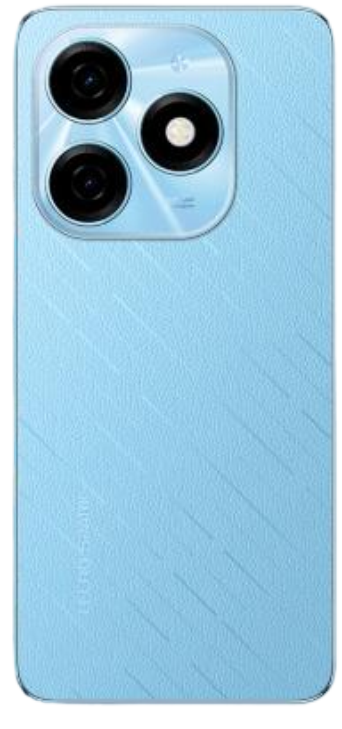
Tecno Spark 20

=== Tecno Camon series ===
- Tecno Camon 11
- Tecno Camon 12
- Tecno Camon 15
- Tecno Camon 16
- Tecno Camon 17
- Tecno Camon 18
- Tecno Camon 19
- Tecno Camon 20
- Tecno Camon 20 Pro
- Tecno Camon 20 Premier
- Tecno Camon 30
- Tecno Camon 30s
- Tecno Camon 30s Pro
- Tecno Camon 30 Pro 5G
- Tecno Camon 30 Premier 5G
- Tecno Camon 40
- Tecno Camon 40 Pro
- Tecno Camon 40 Pro 5G
- Tecno Camon 40 Premier 5G
- Tecno Camon 50 4G
- Tecno Camon 50 Pro 4G
- Tecno Camon 50 Pro
- Tecno Camon 50 Ultra
- Tecno Camon Slim

=== Tecno Phantom series ===
- Tecno Phantom V Flip
- Tecno Phantom V Flip 2
- Tecno Phantom X
- Tecno Phantom X2
- Tecno Phantom X2 Pro
- Tecno Phantom V Fold
- Tecno Phantom V Fold 2

=== Tecno Spark series ===
- Tecno Spark 3
- Tecno Spark 4
- Tecno Spark 5
- Tecno Spark 6
- Tecno Spark 6 Go
- Tecno Spark 7
- Tecno Spark 8
- Tecno Spark 9
- Tecno Spark 10
- Tecno Spark 20
- Tecno Spark 20C
- Tecno Spark 20 Pro
- Tecno Spark 20 Pro+
- Tecno Spark 30C
- Tecno Spark 30C 5G
- Tecno Spark 30
- Tecno Spark 30 Pro
- Tecno Spark 40
- Tecno Spark 40 Pro
- Tecno Spark 40 Pro+
- Tecno Spark 50
- Tecno Spark 50 4G
- Tecno Spark 50 Pro
- Tecno Spark Slim - 5.93mm

=== Tecno Pova series ===
- Tecno Pova 2
- Tecno Pova 4
- Tecno Pova 4 Pro
- Tecno Pova Neo 3
- Tecno Pova 5
- Tecno Pova 5 Pro 5G
- Tecno Pova 6
- Tecno Pova 6 Neo
- Tecno Pova 6 Neo 5G
- Tecno Pova 6 Pro 5G
- Tecno Pova 7
- Tecno Pova 7 Ultra 5G
- Tecno Pova 8 5G
- Tecno Pova 8 Pro
- Tecno Pova Slim 5G - 5.95mm
