= HiOS =

Android-based operating system by Tecno Mobility

- The logo of HiOS

- Developer: Tecno Mobile
- Written in: C (HiOS modifications of Android OS)
- OS family: Android (Linux)
- Working state: Current
- Source model: Closed-source
- Initial release: April 2016; 10 years ago
- Latest release: 16.3.0.160SP03 / November 4, 2026; 3 days ago
- License: Proprietary
- Official website: tecno-mobile.com/hios/home

HiOS (/ˈhaɪɒs/) is a customized Android operating system developed by Chinese mobile phone manufacturer Tecno Mobile, a subsidiary of Transsion Holdings. The OS is used in the company’s smartphones.

HiOS claims to allow for a wide range of user customization without requiring rooting of the mobile device. The operating system is bundled with pre-installed utility applications. The company claimed that the applications would allow users to free up memory, freeze applications, and limit data accessibility to applications, among others.

== Version history ==
In April 2016, HiOS 1.0 was released and was based on Android 6.0. It shipped with a custom home screen app.

Version	Initial release	Android OS	Launch Version	Ref.
1.0	April 2016	6.0	First released on Tecno Boom J8	
2.0	March 2017	7.0	First released on Tecno Camon CX and L9 Plus	
3.0	October 2017	7.0	First released on Phantom 8 and Camon CM	
4.1	November 2018	8.1	First released on Tecno Camon 11 and Camon 11 Pro	
5.0	April 2019	9.0	First released on Tecno SPARK 3 and Phantom 9	
5.5	September 2019	9.0	Unveiled on Tecno Camon 12 and Tecno SPARK 4	
6.0	February 2020	10	First released on Tecno Camon 15	
7.0	September 2020	10	Unveiled on Tecno Camon 16 Series	
7.5	April 2021	11	First released on Tecno SPARK 7 Series	
7.6	May 2021	11	First released on Tecno Camon 17 series	
8.0	October 2021	11		
8.6	June 2022	12		
12	October 2022	12		
13	2023	13	First released on Tecno Camon 20 Series	
13.5	2023	13	First released on Tecno Spark 20 Pro	
14.x.x	2024	14	First released on Tecno Camon 30 Series	
15.x.x	February 2025	15	First released on Tecno Camon 40 Series	
16.x.x	January 2026	16	First released on Tecno Camon 50 Series	

== See also ==
- Android, the operating system HiOS is based on
- XOS, Transsion's other Android skin similar to HiOS and itelOS
- List of custom Android distributions
- Android version history
