= Fingerprint scanner =

Device used to capture fingerprint pattern

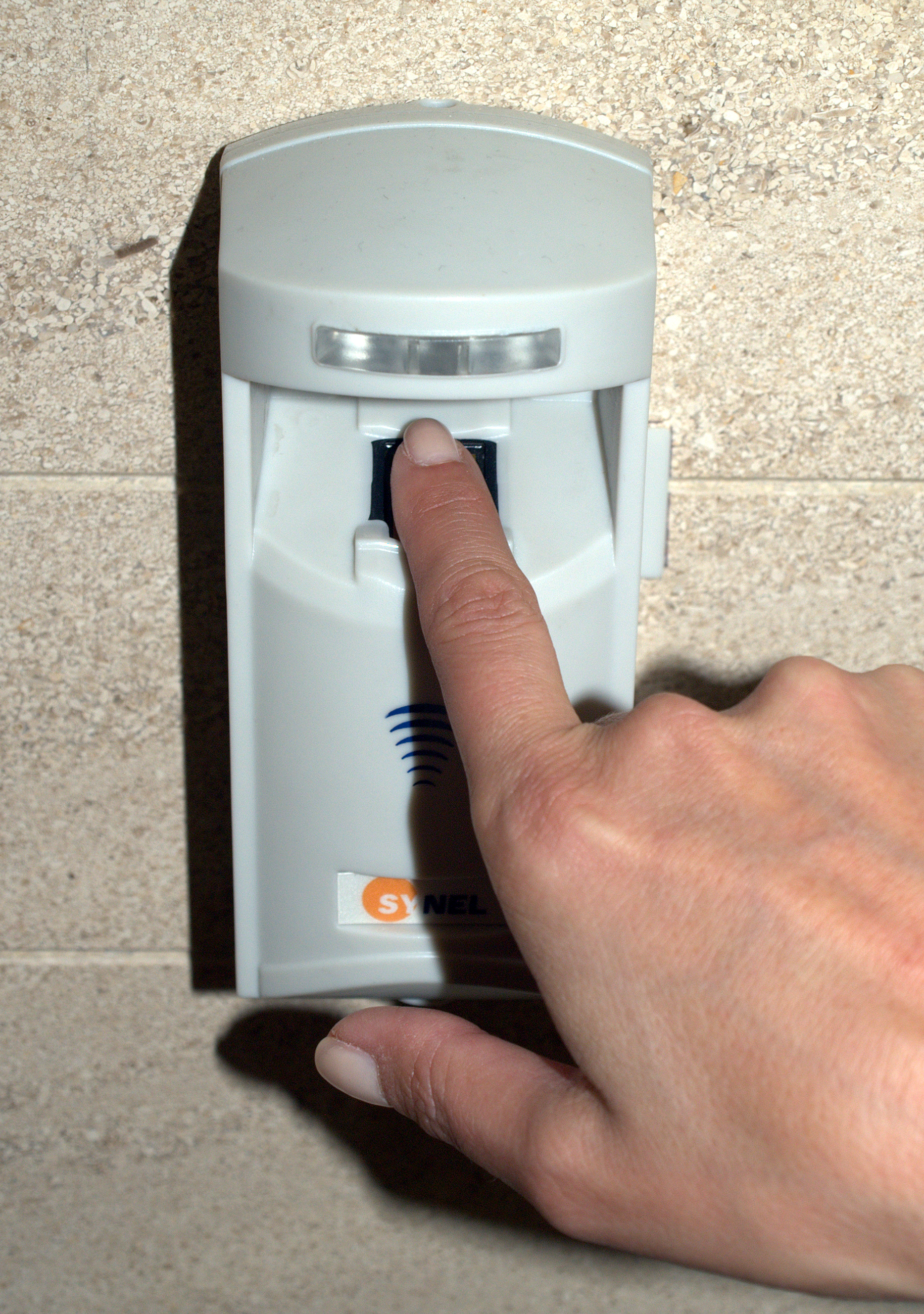
A stand-alone fingerprint scanner, such as one used at the entrance to a building

Fingerprint scanners are a type of biometric security device that identifies an individual by identifying the structure of their fingerprints. They are used in police stations, security industries, smartphones, and other mobile devices.

== Fingerprints ==
People have patterns of friction ridges on their fingers called fingerprints. Fingerprints are uniquely detailed, durable over an individual's lifetime, and difficult to alter. Due to the unique combinations, fingerprints have become a means of identification.

== Types of fingerprint scanners ==
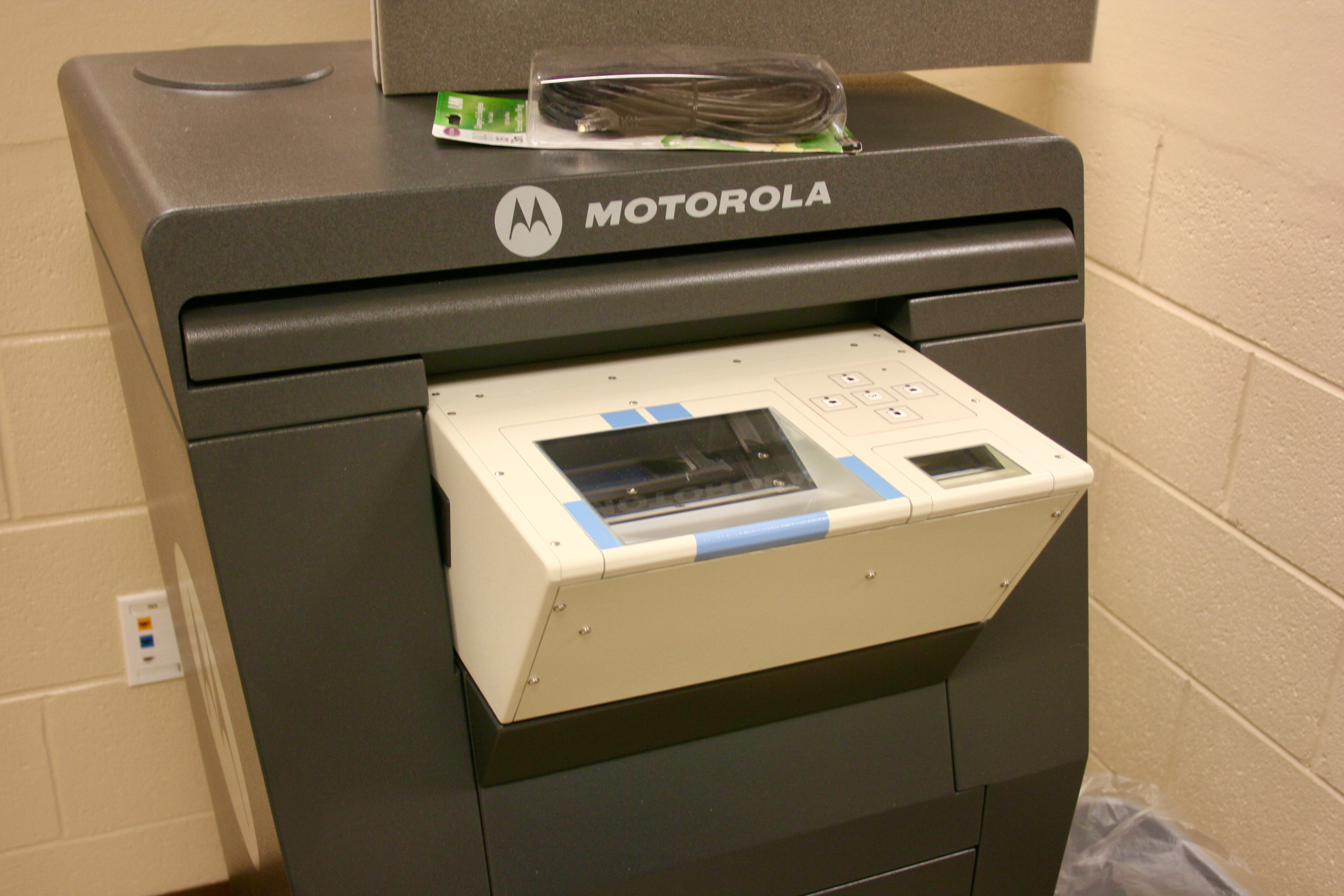
A fingerprint scanner at a prison in the United States

There are four types of fingerprint scanners:

1. Optical scanners take a visual image of the fingerprint using a digital camera.
2. Capacitive or CMOS scanners use capacitors and thus electric current to form an image of the fingerprint. This type of scanner tends to excel in terms of precision.
3. Ultrasonic fingerprint scanners use high frequency sound waves to penetrate the epidermal (outer) layer of the skin.
4. Thermal scanners sense the temperature differences on the contact surface, in between fingerprint ridges and valleys.

All fingerprint scanners are susceptible to spoofing through fingerprints replicated using photographs and 3D printing.

== Construction forms ==
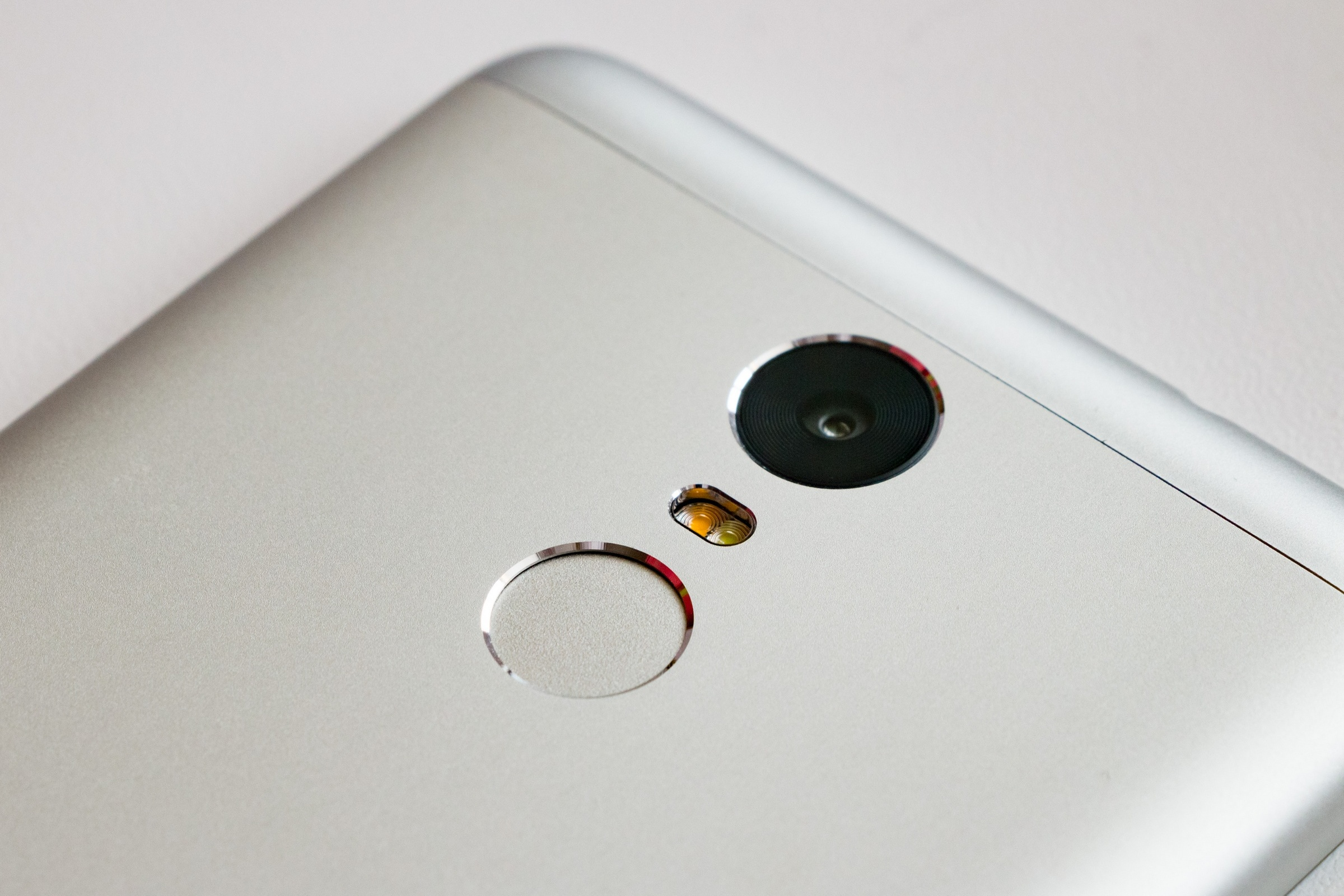
Fingerprint scanner on a smartphone (lower left)

Each type of fingerprint sensor can take two basic forms: the stagnant and the moving fingerprint scanner.

- Stagnant: The scanning module is mounted statically, and the user is required to swipe their fingers across it. This is cheaper but also less reliable than the moving form. Imaging can be less than ideal if the finger is not dragged over the scanning area at constant speed.
- Moving: The scanning module is mounted on a movable surface, while the user's finger can remain static. Because this layout allows the scanning module to pass the fingerprint at a constant speed, this method is generally more reliable.

== Form factors ==
=== Peripherals ===
Add-on fingerprint readers for PCs initially appeared in the late 1990's in the form of PCMCIA modules. Microsoft released a model in its IntelliMouse line with an integrated fingerprint reader in 2005.

=== Integrated readers ===
Laptops with built-in readers emerged around the same time as peripheral readers with devices such as NECs MC/R730F. IBM produced laptops with integrated readers starting in 2004. Apple introduced fingerprint scanners to their devices under the name Touch ID in 2013. These were initially released on the iPhone 5S, with the technology remaining exclusive to iPhones until the release of the 2016 MacBook Pro. On both laptops and smartphones, the fingerprint sensor usually uses a USB or I2C interface internally.

== See also ==
- Fingerprint § Capture and detection
- Optical trackpad
