= Itel A49 =

Budget 4G smartphone

itel A49
- Brand: itel
- Manufacturer: Transsion Holdings
- Series: A series
- First released: March 2022
- Predecessor: Itel A48
- Compatible networks: 2G, 3G, 4G LTE
- Colors: Crystal Purple, Dome Blue, and Sky Cyan
- Operating system: Android 11 (Go edition), itelOS 7.6.0
- System-on-chip: Unisoc SC9832E (28 nm)
- CPU: Quad-core 1.4GHz
- Memory: 2 GB RAM
- Storage: 32 GB
- Removable storage: microSD, up to 128 GB
- Battery: 4,000 mAh
- Rear camera: 5 MP + QVGA Dual Camera
- Front camera: 5 MP
- Display: 6.3-inch Waterdrop Full Screen
- Data inputs: Fingerprint scanner (rear-mounted), Face unlock

The Itel A49 is an entry level of Android-based smartphone developed and manufactured by Itel, a subsidiary of Transsion Holdings. It was first announced and released March 2022 in India.

== Specifications ==
The Itel A49 has three color options: Crystal Purple, Dome Blue, and Sky Cyan. Typically constructed with a combination of plastic materials, it was compared to other Itel phones. Same as the A48, it has a resolution of 720 x 1600 pixels, 20:9 ratio, a 60 Hz refresh rate, but with a ~266 ppi density unlike the A48.

It is powered by an unnamed quad-core processor clocked at 1.4 GHz, paired with 2GB of RAM and 32GB of internal storage. The storage is expandable via a microSD card slot up to 128GB. It is powered by a 4,000mAh battery with AI Power Master power-saving technology.

The itel A49 is equipped with a dual AI rear camera system featuring two 5-megapixel sensors and an LED flash. On the front, it has a 5-megapixel selfie camera that supports AI Beauty mode.

== See also ==
- Itel A50
- Itel A60
- Itel A70
