= Itel A48 =

2021 smartphone model

- Brand: Itel Mobile
- Manufacturer: Itel Mobile
- Type: Smartphone
- Series: Itel A series
- First released: August 17, 2021; 5 years ago
- Availability by region: Bangladesh, Botswana, India, Pakistan, Nepal
- Colors: Black, Purple, Green
- Dimensions: 78×155×9 mm (3.07×6.10×0.35 in)
- Weight: 160 g (6 oz)
- Operating system: Android 10 (Go edition)
- System-on-chip: Unisoc SC9832E (28 nm)
- CPU: Quad-core 1.4 GHz
- GPU: Mali-T820 MP1
- Storage: 32GB
- SIM: Dual SIM
- Battery: 3000 mAh
- Rear camera: 5 MP (wide), 0.08 MP (auxiliary lens)
- Front camera: 5 MP
- Display: IPS LCD

The Itel A48 is an entry-level of Android-based smartphone developed and manufactured by Itel, a subsidiary of Transsion Holdings. It was exclusively announced and released on August 17, 2021 in India.

In Bangladesh, the phone was prized at ৳7,690.

== Specifications ==
=== Design ===
The phone case is made through materials like silicone, TPU, or hard plastic, often with reinforced corners for enhanced shock absorption.

The phone was available at Black, Purple, and Green colors.

=== Processor ===
The phone was equipped with a 4-core 1.4 GHz with a Unisoc SC9832E chipset and a Mali-T820 MP1 graphics processor.

=== Battery ===
The battery capacity of the phone is 3,000 mAh.

=== Display ===
The itel A48 was featured a 6.1-inch IPC LCD display with a resolution of 720 x 1600 pixels; and a 20:9 ratio with a 288 ppi density.

=== Camera ===
The phone's rear camera has a 5 MP wide lens with a 0.08 MP auxiliary lens, and a 5 MP front camera.

=== Storage ===
The Itel A48 was only sold in a 32 GB configuration.

=== Software ===
The Itel A48 runs on Android 10 Go edition.

== See also ==
- Itel Mobile
- Itel A49
- Itel A50
