= AVOW =

German mobile app company

- Type: Private
- Industry: Mobile advertising, app marketing
- Founded: 2018
- Founder: Robert Wildner, Ashwin Shekhar, Orietta Mendez, and Caio Balbino
- Headquarters: Berlin, Germany
- Website: http://www.avow.tech

AVOW is a German company that specializes in acquiring new users for mobile app developers and brands. AVOW has partnerships with global mobile OEMs such as Samsung, Xiaomi, Huawei, Vivo, OPPO, OnePlus, realme, Transsion, Itel, Tecno and Infinix.

== History ==
AVOW was founded in 2018 in Berlin. It offers access to more than 1.85 billion daily active users and is able to generate over 10 million monthly app installs.

On 30 November 2020, AVOW announced a partnership with Xiaomi, in which they became a marketing partner of Xiaomi outside of China. In April 2021, the company announced a partnership with another Chinese smartphone producer, OPPO.

In 2021 AVOW partnered with the smartphone brand Vivo with more than 400 million active users worldwide, and with Huawei.

In July 2022, Huawei Mobile Services and Kumu announced a collaborative partnership via AVOW.

In October 2022, Xiaomi made AVOW its official core agency for the EMEA, Southeast Asia, and LATAM regions.

In August 2023, AVOW launched "AVOW Intelligence", a tool for media buying with mobile OEMs.

In October 2023, AVOW was named as the Gold Agency for Transsion Mobile Internet, and their ad platform Eagllwin. This partnership also made AVOW the debut Transsion Mobile Internet partner in Indonesia.

In May 2024, AVOW partnered with the founders of GameBake to form a new company called KYLN, a multi-channel distribution platform for game and app developers.

In June 2024, AVOW was chosen as Samsung's key partner for Galaxy Store inventory sales in Europe.

In July 2025, AVOW announced a global partnership with HONOR, bringing app distribution to all HONOR devices worldwide. In October 2025, AVOW was presented with the Global Best Support Partner award by HONOR at the HONOR Global Developer Conference.

In January 2026, AVOW released the Mobile OEM Advertising Guide 2026, positioning mobile OEM advertising as the "third pillar" of app growth alongside social and search channels.

In June 2026, AVOW released the Mobile OEM Branding Guide via Business of Apps, focused on on-device branding through mobile OEM inventory as a brand-safe alternative to social media feeds.

In September 2026, AVOW received HONOR’s Global Outstanding Partner Award in Shenzhen, marking its second consecutive year of recognition by HONOR.
