= Fuego Gaming =

Filipino gaming content creator

Personal information
- Name: Jon Arvin Villanueva Tenoria

Career information
- Game: Mobile Legends: Bang Bang
- Role: Content creator
- Years active: 2017–present

TikTok information
- Page: Fuego ONLY Account
- Genres: Gaming; Educational content
- Followers: 3.6 million

YouTube information
- Channel: Fuego Gaming Official
- Years active: 2025–present
- Genres: Gaming; Educational content
- Subscribers: 34.9 thousand
- Views: 3.1 million
- Last updated: November 18, 2026

Jon Arvin Villanueva Tenoria, commonly known as Fuego Gaming, is a Filipino content creator, educator, and gaming personality known for his educational content on the video game Mobile Legends: Bang Bang. He gained recognition for combining his background in teaching with gameplay tutorials and strategic guides for players.

== Early life and education ==
While studying, Tenoria worked as a student assistant and would wake up early in the morning to play the game, demonstrating early dedication to gaming. He later graduated with a degree in secondary education, majoring in music, arts, physical education and health (MAPEH), and pursued a career in teaching.

== Career ==
=== Teaching and transition to content creation ===
Tenoria worked as a teacher after graduation while continuing to play Mobile Legends: Bang Bang. During the COVID-19 pandemic, changes in the education system prompted him to explore content creation, leading to the creation of his online persona, Fuego Gaming.

He initially struggled to gain an audience during his first one to two years of streaming. Eventually, he developed a unique approach by integrating his teaching background into his content, focusing on educational gameplay and tutorials.

=== Mobile Legends: Bang Bang journey ===
Tenoria learned to play Mobile Legends: Bang Bang in 2017, initially borrowing his mother's phone due to lack of personal resources. He became known for producing instructional videos that explain game mechanics, hero builds, and strategies in Mobile Legends: Bang Bang. His content includes tutorials on understanding the game's meta and improving player performance, which contributed to his growing audience.

He is known to primarily play as a "roamer" and frequently uses heroes such as Joy, Grock, and Chou. He also launched his own esports team, Fuego Esports, and collaborated with other gaming personalities and players within the MLBB community. In November 2025, the team visited the Palompon Institute of Technology, where they held a friendly match against student players as part of an esports engagement activity.

=== Public appearances, collaborations, and partnerships ===
Tenoria has participated in gaming-related events, including watch parties such as the ''Mobile Legends: Bang Bang'' Mid Season Cup 2025, where he appeared as one of the featured guests.

He was also involved in the production of a localized music video adaptation related to the M7 World Championship theme, collaborating with other creators.

Tenoria has collaborated with technology brands in relation to his content creation and gaming career. He became a partner of Infinix, promoting gaming devices such as the Infinix GT 20 Pro, which he used for creating Mobile Legends: Bang Bang content and streaming. The device was also featured during events such as the MPL Philippines Season 15, where he showcased its performance for competitive gameplay.

== Personal life ==
Outside of content creation, Tenoria has spoken about personal challenges, including early struggles in streaming and balancing his professional career with gaming. He passed the Licensure Examination for Teachers in 2022.

In 2025, he lost a substantial amount of weight through diet and exercise after experiencing online criticism and health concerns.
