= Note 7 (disambiguation) =

The Samsung Galaxy Note 7, commonly known as Note 7, is an Android-based phablet released by Samsung Electronics in 2016.

Note 7 may also refer to:

== Smartphones ==
- Infinix Note 7, released by Infinix in 2020
- Redmi Note 7, released by Xiaomi in 2019

== Other topics ==
- Tegra Note 7, tablet computer designed by Nvidia and released in 2013
- The Blue Note 7, American jazz septet founded in 2008
