= Itel A80 =

- Manufacturer: Itel Mobile
- Series: Itel A series
- First released: September 2024
- Predecessor: Itel A70
- Compatible networks: 2G / 3G / 4G LTE
- Colors: Sandstone Black, Glacier White, Wave Blue
- Dimensions: 8.5 mm thickness
- Operating system: Android 14, itel OS 14
- System-on-chip: Unisoc T603
- CPU: Octa-core
- Storage: 128GB storage with microSDXC
- SIM: Dual SIM
- Battery: 5000 mAh
- Charging: 10W wired
- Rear camera: Single 50 MP auxiliary lens, with dual-LED flash and HDR; Video: 1080p @ 30fps
- Front camera: 8 MP
- Display: IPS LCD with 120Hz refresh rate, 500 nits, 720 x 1600 px (20:9); 262 ppi density
- Website: http://www.itel-life.com/ph/products/phone/a-series/a80

The Itel A80 is an entry level of Android-based smartphone developed and manufactured by Itel, a subsidiary of Transsion Holdings. It is first announced and released in the Philippines in September 2024 and a successor to the Itel A70. In January 2025, the Itel A80 was officially released in India, pricing at 6,999 ₹ (rupees).

The back panel is made of gloss, featuing 3 color options: Sandstone Black, Glacier White, and Wave Blue. It also features an IP54 waterproof rating from splashes. The A80 runs on itel OS 14, which is based on Android 14.
