= Itel P65 =

Android smartphone with cyber mecha design

itel P65
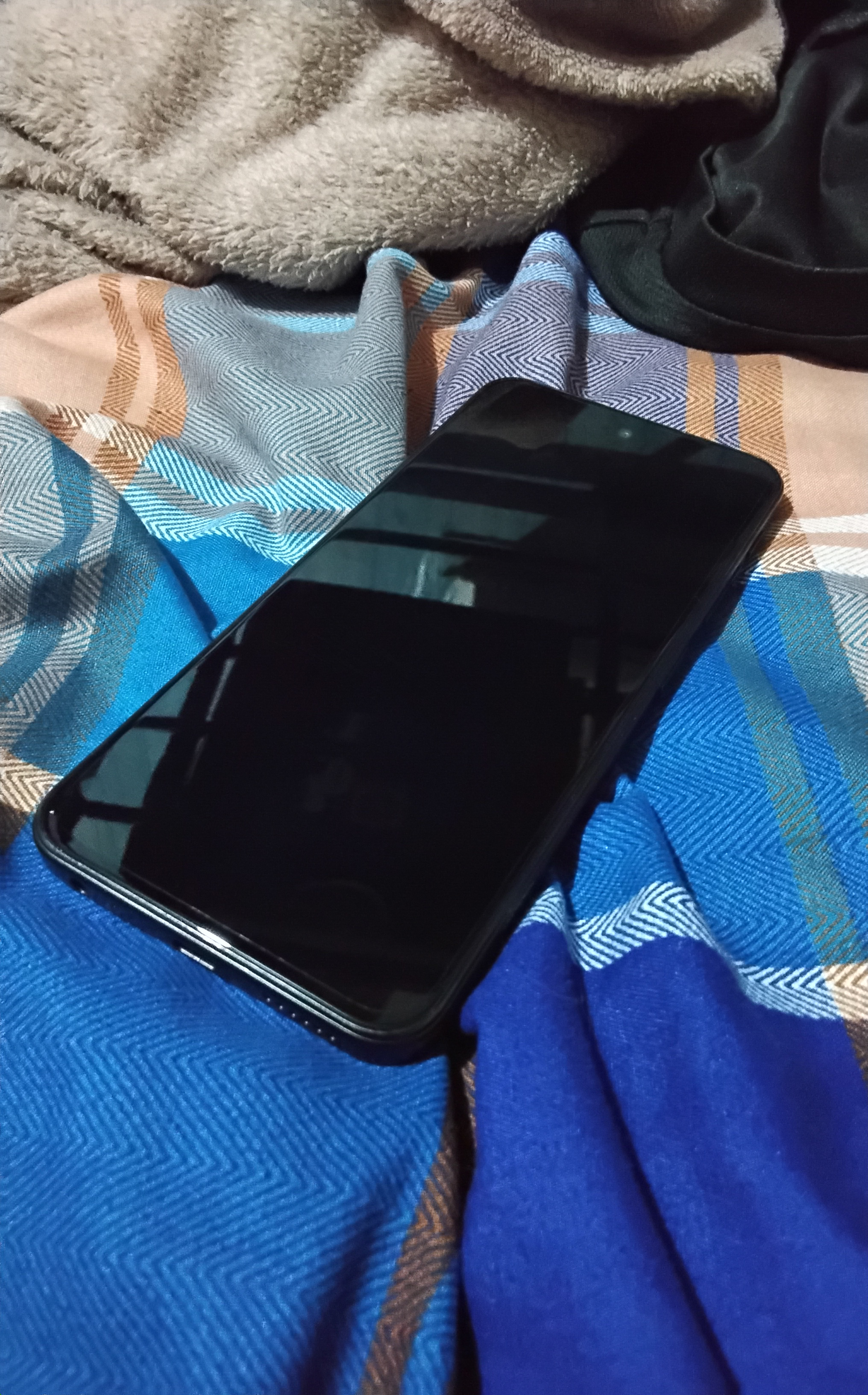
- Itel P65 in Cyber Blaze
- Brand: itel
- Manufacturer: Transsion Holdings
- Series: P series
- Availability by region: Philippines: August 8, 2024; Indonesia: August 18, 2024
- Predecessor: Itel P55
- Compatible networks: GSM, HSPA, LTE
- Colors: Cyber Blaze, Cyber Black, Cyber Titanium
- Dimensions: 165.9×77.3×7.9 mm (6.53×3.04×0.31 in)
- Weight: 6.81 oz (193 g)
- Operating system: Android 14 with itel OS 14.0.0
- System-on-chip: Unisoc T615 (12 nm)
- CPU: Octa-core (2x1.8 GHz Cortex-A75 & 6x1.6 GHz Cortex-A55)
- GPU: Mali-G57 MP1
- Memory: 4 GB, 6 GB, or 8 GB RAM
- Storage: 128 GB or 256 GB
- Removable storage: microSDXC
- Battery: 5,000 mAh Li-Po; Includes 2400 mAh charging case Total: 7400 mAh
- Charging: 18W wired
- Rear camera: Single-Camera Setup; Primary: 50 MP, f/1.6, 27mm (wide), 1/2.8", 0.64 µm, AF; Auxiliary lens; Camera features: LED flash, HDR, Panorama; Video recording: 1080p@30fps, 720p@30fps
- Front camera: 8 MP, f/2.0, 26mm (wide), 1/4.0", 1.12 µm, FF; Video recording: 1080p@30fps, 720p@30fps
- Display: 6.7 in (170 mm) IPS LCD, 120Hz; 720 x 1600 pixels, 20:9 ratio (~262 ppi density)
- Sound: Loudspeaker, 3.5mm jack
- Connectivity: Wi-Fi, Bluetooth, GPS, NFC (256GB/6GB model only), FM radio, USB-C with OTG
- Data inputs: Fingerprint (side-mounted), accelerometer, proximity
- Model: P671L
- Other: LED notification ring on the rear, FlexButton

The Itel P65 is a budget Android-based smartphone known for its cyber mecha-themed backplate and a FlexButton above the volume controls. It was manufactured, designed, and released by Transsion Holdings under its sub-brand itel Mobile, and was launched on August 8, 2024, in the Philippines and ten days later in Indonesia.

Another feature for the device is the Bypass Charging, a feature that powers the motherboard directly from the charger and a Gyro sensor for gaming that provides a more stable experience.

== Design, appearance and features ==
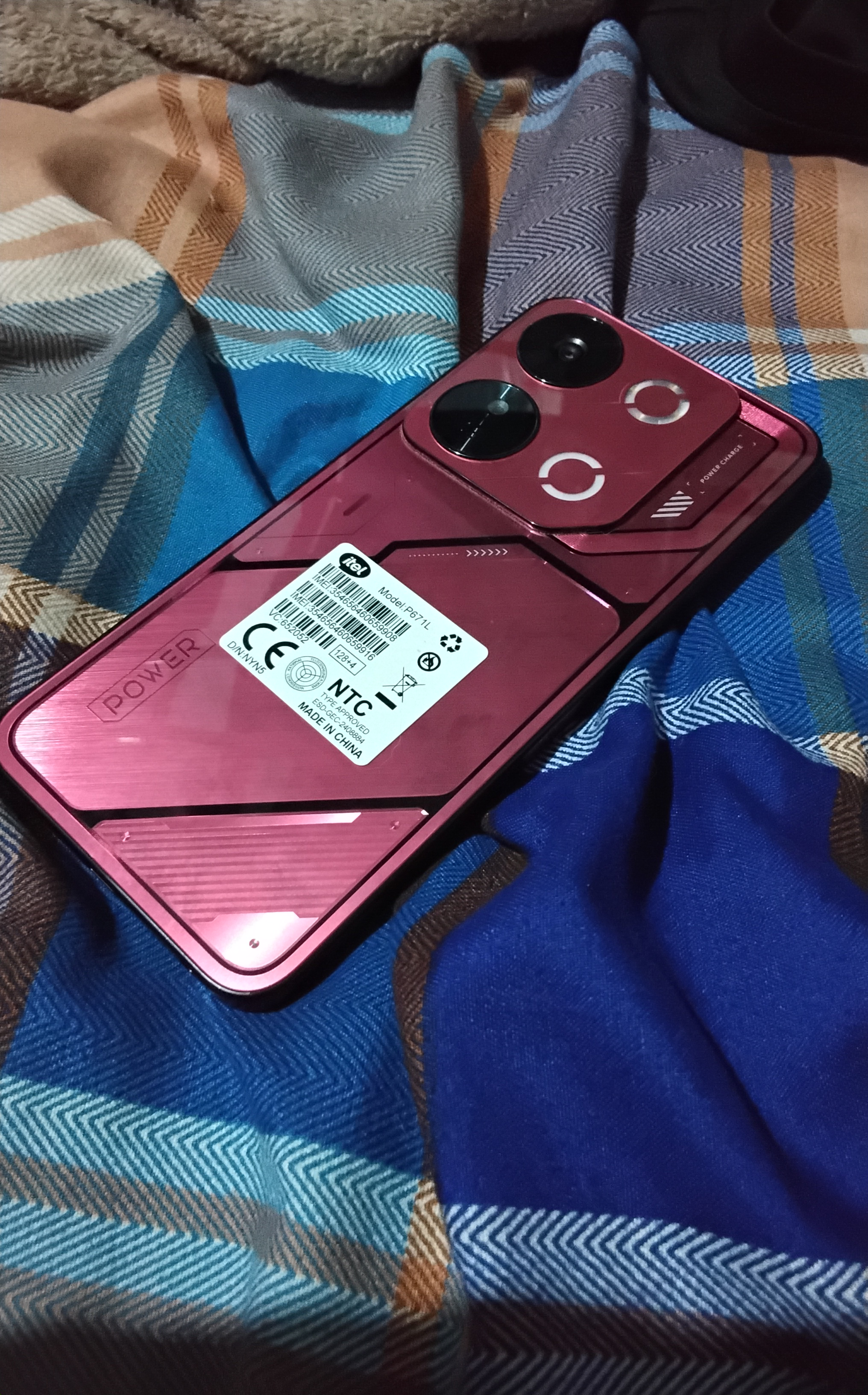
Rear side of the Itel P65

The P65 features a cyber mecha design at the back with the "Cyber Shield" material made of cold-rolled steel with metallic finish, which features "a blend of ultramodern style and integrated functionality" and give the impresson of the design "gamer looks with various lines resembling a mecha’s armor", and the front is made of glass. Aside from the camera island a distinctive LED notification that was customizable was installed. The LED notification signals the following colors: blue for notifications, cyan for charging, indigo for gaming, and red for low battery.

Above the volume control on another special feature was the FlexButton. It comes in multiple shortcuts ("Camera", "Mute", "Do Not Disturb" "Game Space", "Screen Recording", "Quick Note", "Sound Recording" and a customizable function for other apps as well or disabled by pressing "No Operation"). A gaming feature includes the iBoost Game Engine for optimizing gaming experience and performance.

It was available at 3 color options: Cyber Blaze, Cyber Black, and Cyber Titanium.

== Technical specifications ==
=== Hardware ===
The P65 is powered by a Unisoc T615 processor under its octa-core CPU composed of two Cortex-A75 cores clocking at 1.8 GHz and six Cortex-A55 cores clocking at 1.6 GHz. It also has a Mali-G57 MP1 graphics processor and housed by a 5,000 mAh li-po battery with 18W fast charging support that can take up to 30 minutes to reach 40% and a charging case with a battery capacity of 2400 mAh. When combined, it has a total battery capacity of 7400 mAh.

For storage, it has a capacity of either 128GB or 256GB of internal storage and RAM of either 4, 6, or 8GB of memory.

Externally, it was equipped with a 6.7-inch IPS LCD display with a refresh rate of 120 Hz, a resolution of 720 × 1600 pixels (HD+), a 20:9 ratio and a pixel density of 262 ppi. At the top of the display, it comes with itel's Dynamic Bar. On the camera island, the itel P65 also includes a single 50-megapixel AI sensor camera on the rear and an 8-megapixel front camera at the front of the device. Both cameras can record up to 1080p at 30fps.

=== Software ===
The Itel P65 rund on Android 14 mobile operating system with the itel OS 14 user interface.
