= Itel A47 =

Entry-level Android smartphone

itel A47
- Brand: itel Mobile
- Manufacturer: Transsion Holdings
- Type: Smartphone
- Series: A series
- First released: February 1, 2021
- Availability by region: February 2021
- Form factor: Slate
- Dimensions: 149×72×10 mm (5.87×2.83×0.39 in)
- Weight: 164 g (6 oz)
- Operating system: Android 9.0 (Pie) (Go Edition)
- CPU: 1.4 GHz Quad-core (Unisoc SC9832E)
- GPU: Mali-T820 MP1
- Memory: 2 GB RAM
- Storage: 32 GB
- Removable storage: microSD, up to 32 GB (dedicated slot)
- Battery: 3020 mAh Li-ion (removable)
- Rear camera: 5 MP + 0.3 MP (VGA) AI Dual Camera; LED flash, 720p video
- Front camera: 5 MP with soft LED flash
- Display: 5.5 in (140 mm) IPS LCD; 720 x 1440 pixels, 18:9 ratio (~293 ppi density)
- Sound: Loudspeaker, 3.5 mm jack
- Connectivity: 4G LTE, Wi-Fi 802.11 b/g/n, Bluetooth 4.2, GPS/A-GPS, Micro-USB 2.0
- Data inputs: Fingerprint scanner (rear-mounted), accelerometer, proximity sensor
- Model: L5505

The itel A47 is an entry-level Android smartphone developed and manufcatured by itel Mobile. It was released in India on February 1, 2021 via Amazon stores, as well as EMI options.

== Specifications ==
=== Design & display ===
The device features a 5.5-inch LCD IPS screen. It was released in two gradient finish color options: Ice Lake Blue and Cosmic Purple.

=== Hardware ===
The phone is powered by a quad-core Unisoc processor clocked at 1.4 GHz. It includes 2GB of RAM and 32GB of internal storage, which is expandable via a dedicated microSD slot up to an additional 32GB.

=== Cameras ===
The rear camera system consists of a dual-lens setup featuring a 5-megapixel primary sensor and a VGA secondary sensor, accompanied by an LED flash. The front-facing "selfie" camera is a 5-megapixel sensor also equipped with an LED flash.

=== Battery & connectivity ===
The device is powered by a 3,000mAh battery. Connectivity features include dual SIM (nano) support, 4G VoLTE, Wi-Fi 802.11 b/g/n, Bluetooth 4.2, and a micro-USB port. It also retains a 3.5mm headphone jack.

=== Software & security ===
The itel A47 runs on the Android 9.0 Pie (Go Edition) operating system. For security, it features a rear-mounted fingerprint scanner (capable of unlocking in 0.2 seconds) and face unlock technology.
