= Itel A26 =

2021 Itel smartphone

itel A26
- Brand: itel
- Manufacturer: Transsion Holdings
- Series: A series
- First released: September 22, 2021
- Compatible networks: GSM, UMTS (3G), LTE (4G)
- Colors: Deep Blue, Gradation Green, and Light Purple
- Dimensions: 148.0×72.3×9.9 mm (5.83×2.85×0.39 in)
- Weight: 164 g (5.78 oz)
- Operating system: Android 10 (Go edition)
- CPU: Quad-core 1.4 GHz Spreadtrum SC9832E
- GPU: ARM Mali-T820 @ 600 MHz
- Memory: 2 GB RAM
- Storage: 32 GB
- Removable storage: microSD, microSDHC, microSDXC (up to 64 GB)
- SIM: Dual Nano-SIM (dual stand-by)
- Battery: 3,020 mAh Li-Ion
- Rear camera: 5 MP, AF; 0.3 MP (secondary); LED flash
- Front camera: 2 MP
- Display: 5.7 in (140 mm) IPS TFT; 720 x 1520 pixels, 19:9 ratio (~295 ppi density)
- Media: MP3, WAV, eAAC+, AAC+, player
- Connectivity: Wi-Fi 802.11 b/g/n, Bluetooth, GPS with A-GPS, Micro-USB 2.0, 3.5mm jack

The itel A26 is an entry-level Android smartphone developed by itel, a brand under Transsion Holdings. It was officially launched in India on September 22, 2021, targeting the budget-conscious segment with a price point below ₹6,000.

== Specifications ==
=== Design and display ===
The itel A26 features a 5.7-inch IPS TFT display with an HD+ resolution of 1600 x 720 pixels and a 19:9 aspect ratio. The screen includes a waterdrop notch for the front camera and a prominent chin at the bottom. The device was released in three color options: Gradation Green, Light Purple, and Deep Blue.

=== Hardware ===
The phone is powered by a Unisoc SC9832e quad-core processor. It comes with a single configuration of 2 GB of RAM and 32 GB of internal storage, which can be expanded via a microSD card up to 128 GB. For security, the device lacks a physical fingerprint scanner, relying instead on a software-based face unlock feature. It is equipped with a 3,020 mAh battery and supports 5W charging via a micro-USB port.

=== Camera ===
The device features a dual-camera setup on the rear, consisting of a 5-megapixel primary sensor and a secondary VGA lens. The front-facing camera, housed in the waterdrop notch, is a 2-megapixel sensor.

=== Software and connectivity ===
The itel A26 runs on Android 10 (Go Edition), a version of Android optimized for low-end hardware. Connectivity features include dual-SIM support, 4G VoLTE, Wi-Fi, Bluetooth, and GPS.
