= Itel A70 =

2023 Android smartphone

- Manufacturer: Itel Mobile
- First released: November 2023
- Predecessor: Itel A60
- Successor: Itel A80
- Compatible networks: GSM / HSPA / LTE
- Colors: Brilliant Gold, Stylish Black, Field Green, Azure Blue
- Dimensions: 8.6 mm thickness
- Operating system: Android 13 (Go edition), itelOS 13.0.0
- System-on-chip: Unisoc T603
- CPU: Octa-core
- Storage: 64GB 4GB RAM, 128GB 3GB RAM, 128GB 4GB RAM, 256GB 4GB RAM
- Removable storage: microSDXC
- SIM: Dual SIM
- Battery: 5000 mAh
- Charging: 10W
- Rear camera: 13 MP auxiliary lens, features dual-LED flash and HDR
- Front camera: 8 MP
- Display: IPS LCD, 500 nits, 720 x 1612 px, 20:9 aspect ratio 267 ppi density

The Itel A70 is an entry of Android-based smartphone developed and manufactured by Itel Mobile, a subsidiary of Transsion Holdings. First announced on October 30, 2023, it was first released in November 2023 in the Philippines, and in January 2024 in India.

It is powered with the Unisoc T603 chipset, an octa-core CPU, and a PowerVR GE8322 GPU. The battery capacity is 5000 mAh and comes with a 10W charging, with screen hours can clock around 5-6 hours. The itel A70 features a single 13MP camera with dual LED flash and an 8MP front camera.

The itel A70 runs on itelOS 13, which is based on Android 13 Go Edition.

== See also ==
- Itel A60
