= Itel A100 Pro =

Entry-level smartphone by itel Mobile

itel A100 Pro
- Brand: itel
- Manufacturer: Transsion Holdings
- Series: itel "A" series
- First released: May 20, 2026; 54 days ago
- Availability by region: India: May 20, 2026; 54 days ago
- Related: itel A100 itel A100C
- Compatible networks: GSM, HSPA, LTE
- Colors: Comet Orange, Natural Black, Cloud White
- Dimensions: 8.5 mm thickness
- Operating system: Android 15 (Go edition), itel OS 15
- System-on-chip: Unisoc T7100
- CPU: Octa-core processor, 1.8 GHz
- GPU: PowerVR GE8322
- Memory: 3 GB or 4 GB RAM
- Storage: 64 GB
- Removable storage: microSDXC (dedicated slot)
- SIM: Dual Nano-SIM
- Battery: 5000 mAh
- Charging: 10W standard charging
- Rear camera: 8 MP, LED flash, 1080p@30fps
- Front camera: 5 MP
- Display: 6.56 in (167 mm) IPS LCD, 90Hz, 400 nits
- Sound: Loudspeaker, 3.5mm jack
- Connectivity: Wi-Fi 802.11a/b/g/n/ac (dual-band), Bluetooth 5.0 (A2DP, LE), GPS, Infrared port, USB-C
- Data inputs: Fingerprint (side-mounted), accelerometer
- Website: https://www.itel-india.com/product/a100-pro

The itel A100 Pro is an entry-level Android smartphone manufactured, marketed, and design by Transsion Holdings under the brand itel Mobile. It was released on May 20, 2026 in India.

== Specifications ==
=== Design ===
In terms of design, the appearance is similar to the Apple iPhone 17 Pro, which "aimed at users who want a stylish device without spending too much". It was available at three color options: Comet Orange, Natural Black, and Cloud White. It also equipped by a military-grade MIL-STD-810H for durability, that applies with rugged company's devices.

=== Hardware ===
The A100 Pro is powered by a Unisoc T7100 processor under its unspecified octa-core clocking at 1.8 GHz and a PowerVR GE8322 graphics processor. It was also powered by a 5,000 mAh battery with 10-watt standard charging.

The A100 Pro only has its 64GB configuration, with an option of 3 or 4 gigabytes of RAM. It also has a memory extension with a virtual RAM of 5GB.

Externally, it has a 6.56-inch IPS LCD display with a resolution of 720 × 1612 pixels, a 90 Hz refresh rate, a 20:9 ratio, and a pixel density of 269 ppi. It also received an 8-megapixel rear camera with advanced image processing and a 5-megapixel front camera with video recording up to 1080p @ 30fps.

=== Software ===
The A100 Pro runs on Android 15 Go edition with the itel OS 15 user interface. It also uses Dynamic Bar at the top of the display.
