= Itel S23 =

Android smartphones

Itel S23 Itel S23+
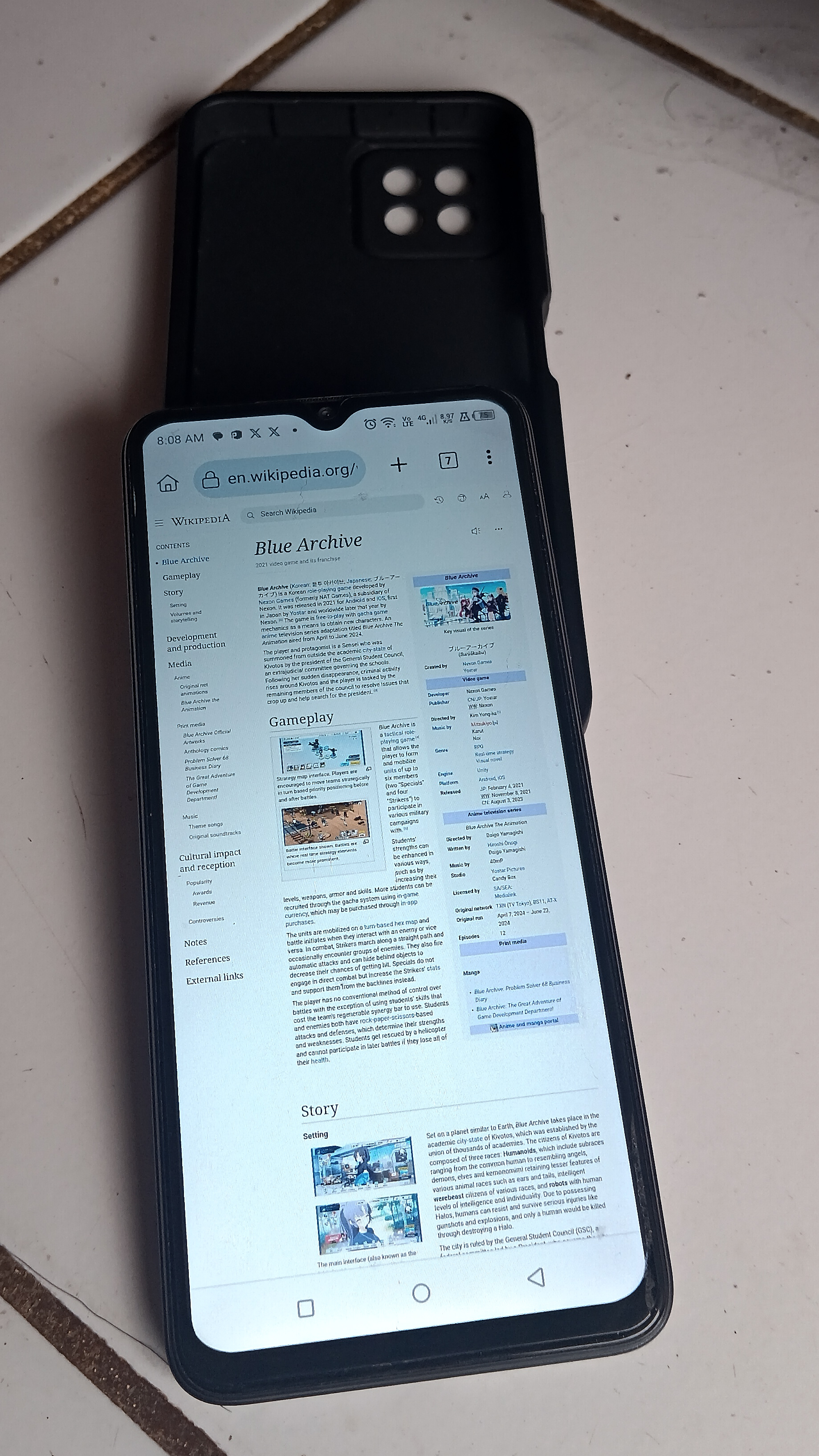
- Manufacturer: Itel Mobile
- Series: Itel S series
- First released: May 24, 2023; 3 years ago (S23 4G); September 20, 2023; 3 years ago (S23+)
- Successor: Itel S24
- Compatible networks: 2G / 3G / 4G LTE
- Dimensions: 164 mm (6.5 in) H 76 mm (3.0 in) W 8 mm (0.31 in) D (S23 4G); 164.5 mm (6.48 in) H 75.2 mm (2.96 in) W 7.9 mm (0.31 in) D (S23+)
- Weight: 195 g (6.9 oz) (S23 4G); 178 g (6.3 oz) (S23+)
- Operating system: ItelOS 8.6.0 (Android 12) (S23 4G); ItelOS 13 (Android 13) (S23+)
- CPU: Octa-core 2x1.6 GHz Cortex-A75 & 6x1.6 GHz Cortex-A55 (S23 4G); Octa-core 2x2.0 GHz Cortex-A75 & 6x1.8 GHz Cortex-A55 (S23+)
- GPU: Mali G57 MP1
- Memory: 4 or 8 GB RAM
- Storage: 128 or 256 GB
- Battery: Li-Po 5000 mAh
- Charging: USB Type-C; S23: 10W wired S23+: 18W wired
- Rear camera: 50 MP + 0.08 MP, f/2.2, PDAF with LED flash, HDR, panorama, Pro, Super Night (1080p@30fps)
- Front camera: 8 MP (S23 4G); 32 MP, f/2.0 (S23+)
- Connectivity: Wi-Fi 802.11 /b/g/n, dual-band, Wi-Fi Direct; Bluetooth 5.0, A2DP, LE

The Itel S23 is a series of Android-based smartphones developed, manufactured, designed, and market by Itel Mobile. This phone was announced in Indonesia in May 2023 for the S23 4G model, and in September 2023 for the S23+ model.

== Design ==
The back panel has a flat finish with a glossy texture reminiscent of glass. The white variant, which uniquely shifts color under UV light or direct sunlight, transitioning from white to a subtle purple hue.

== Technical specifications ==
=== Dimensions ===
The device has a dimension of 164 × 76 × 8 mm (with some variants noted as 165 × 76.3 × 8.6 mm). Weighing between 185 g and 195 g.

=== Processor ===
==== Itel S23 ====
The Itel S23 is powered by the Unisoc T606 chipset. It features an octa-core CPU configuration with 2 cores of Cortex-A75 and 6 cores of Cortex-A55, all clocked at about 1.6 GHz.

==== Itel S23+ ====
The Itel S23+ has the Unisoc Tiger T616 processor. It also has an octa-core setup but with faster cores: 2 cores of Cortex-A75 running at 2.0 GHz coupled with 6 Cortex-A55 cores at 1.8 GHz.

=== Display ===
The front of the Itel S23 is equipped by a 6.6-inch IPS LCD display and AMOLED, 500 nits for the S23+. The design incorporates a waterdrop notch that houses the front-facing camera. With a 90Hz refresh rate, the display offers smooth transitions and responsive touch interactions.

The Itel S23+ comes with the Corning Gorilla Glass 5 protection. The device was distinctive for its Dynamic Bar at the top of the display, which uses their own version of Apple's Dynamic Island.

=== Camera ===
A circular camera module is on the rear, housing a 50 MP with f/1.6 aperture primary camera along with an LED flash. This module is complemented by an additional decorative element. On the front is a selfie camera with a MP of 8.

The Itel S23+ features a dual-camera module on the rear, consisting of the same 50 MP primary sensor with the same aperture and autofocus capabilities, alongside a 0.08 MP auxiliary lens. On the front is a selfie camera with an upgrade of 32 MP.

=== Battery ===
Both smartphones powered by a 5000 mAh lithium‑polymer battery. Charging is facilitated via a USB Type‑C port supporting 10W (18W for S23+) wired charging.

=== Software ===
The Itel S23 runs on Android 12 with the ItelOS 8.6.0 interface and the S23+ runs on Android 13 with the ItelOS interface.
