= Infinix Note 60 =

Mid-range smartphone manufactured by Infinix

- Brand: Infinix
- Manufacturer: Infinix Mobile
- Series: Infinix Note
- First released: March 2026
- Related: Infinix Note 60 Pro; Infinix Note 60 Ultra
- Compatible networks: GSM, HSPA, LTE, 5G
- Form factor: Touchscreen
- Colors: Mist Titanium, Midnight Black, Fizz Blue, Rose Gold, Mocha Brown
- Dimensions: 162.4×77.2×7.5 mm (6.39×3.04×0.30 in)
- Weight: 199 g (7.0 oz)
- Operating system: Android 16, XOS 16
- System-on-chip: Mediatek Dimensity 7400 Ultimate (4 nm)
- CPU: Octa-core (4x2.6 GHz Cortex-A78 & 4x2.0 GHz Cortex-A55)
- GPU: Mali-G615 MC2
- Memory: 8 GB RAM
- Storage: 128 GB / 256 GB UFS 2.2
- Removable storage: No
- SIM: Dual Nano-SIM + eSIM (max 2 active)
- Battery: 6150 mAh or 6500 mAh
- Charging: 45W wired, 30W wireless Includes Bypass Charging
- Rear camera: Dual: 50 MP, f/1.6, (wide), 0.8µm, PDAF, OIS; 8 MP, f/2.2, 112˚ (ultrawide), 1.12µm; Video: 4K@30fps; 1080p@30/60/120fps
- Front camera: 13 MP, f/2.2, (wide), 1.12µm Video: 4K@30fps; 1080p@30/60fps
- Display: 6.78 in (112.1 cm²) AMOLED, 144Hz
- Sound: Stereo speakers, tuned by JBL (No 3.5mm jack)
- Connectivity: Wi-Fi 802.11 a/b/g/n/ac, dual-band, Bluetooth 5.4, GPS, NFC, Infrared port, USB-C 2.0
- Data inputs: Fingerprint scanner (under display, optical), accelerometer, gyro, proximity, compass, heart rate, SpO2
- Water resistance: IP64 dust tight and water resistant
- Model: X6879
- Development status: Available, announced on February 18, 2026
- Other: Glass front, with Gorilla Glass 7i protector

The Infinix Note 60 5G is a mid-range smartphone manufactured, designed, and marketed by Infinix Mobile. It was launched in March 2026 alongside Note 60 Pro and Note 60 Ultra. It also supports satellite communication, along with the Note 60 Pro and Note 60 Ultra.

== Specifications ==
=== Design & hardware ===
In terms of design, the manufacturer uses their own Apple iPhone 17's style with an octagonal island. The Note 60 5G comes in Mist Titanium, Midnight Black, Fizz Blue, Rose Gold, Mocha and Brown color options with Gorilla Glass 7i screen protector in the front. Below is a built-in dual stereo speaker modified by JBL. In the rear, a distinctive "RGB Halo Light" was displayed at the top row of the camera island.

The front is equipped by a 6.78-inch 1.5k AMOLED display with a ~89.4% screen-to-body ratio, a resolution of 1208 x 2644 pixels (19.5:9 ratio, ~429 ppi density), and Ultra HDR support. The screen supports a 144 Hz refresh rate, 2304 Hz PWM dimming, and reaches a peak brightness of 4,500 nits.

The smartphone is driven by the MediaTek Dimensity 7400 Ultimate chipset, built on a 4-nanometer process. Its octa-core central processing unit (CPU) comprises four performance Cortex-A78 cores clocked at 2.6 GHz and four efficiency Cortex-A55 cores clocked at 2.0 GHz, coupled with a Mali-G615 MC2 graphics processing unit (GPU).

In terms of memory and storage, the device lacks an external card slot and relies on UFS 2.2 internal storage. It is offered in two configurations: 128GB of internal storage with 8GB of RAM, or 256GB of internal storage with 8GB of RAM.

=== Cooling system ===
Aside from the Note 60 Pro, the Note 60 has its integrated 3D IceCore Vapor Chamber (VC) cooling system.

=== Cameras ===
The Infinix Note 60 5G features a dual-camera array on the rear. The primary wide-angle lens utilizes a 50-megapixel sensor with an f/1.6 aperture, 0.8 µm pixel size, Phase Detection Autofocus (PDAF), and Optical Image Stabilization (OIS). This is paired with an 8-megapixel ultrawide lens featuring an f/2.2 aperture, a 112-degree field of view, and a 1.12 µm pixel size. The rear camera assembly is equipped with a dual-LED flash and supports HDR and panorama modes. Video capture capabilities for the primary camera include 4K resolution at 30fps, and 1080p resolution at 30, 60, or 120fps.

On the front, the selfie camera consists of a single 13-megapixel wide lens with an f/2.2 aperture and 1.12 µm pixel size. The front-facing camera is capable of recording video at up to 4K at 30fps and 1080p at 30 or 60fps.

=== Software ===
The device launches out of the box running the Android 16 operating system, customized with Infinix's proprietary XOS 16 user interface skin. To ensure software longevity, Infinix officially commits to providing up to 3 major Android version upgrades for the device.
