= Infinix Note 3 =

Android phablet smartphone produced by Infinix Mobile

Infinix Note 3 is an Android phablet smartphone developed and produced by Infinix Mobile. The Note 3 was unveiled November 2015 and was released globally in August 2016.

== Specifications ==
=== Hardware ===
The Infinix Note 3 features a 6.0-inch Full HD display with a 1920 x 1080 resolution (pixel density at 367ppi). The Infinix Note 3 which runs on a 1.3 GHz octa-core MediaTek MT6753 CPU with 2GB of RAM. The phone has metal edges around the screen.

Infinix Note 3 also incorporates a non-removable 4500 mAh lithium-ion battery. The phone supports fast charge thanks to the inclusion of dual 4.5A charging engines with PE+2.0 technology. The note 3 is also equipped with Aerospace Cooling Technology (ACT). A Fingerprint scanner was also added.

=== Software ===
The Infinix Note 3 originally shipped with Android 6.0 Marshmallow, running the custom Chameleon XOS software.

=== Camera ===
The main (rear-facing) camera is a 13 MP autofocus camera with 0.25s autofocus while the secondary (front-facing) camera is a 3.7 MP camera. 20.7 Mega pixel

== Note 3 Pro ==
The Note 3 Pro was released in September, 2016 just a month after the Note 3 was made available to the public. Pro's distinguishing features are a bump up in RAM size from 2GB to 3GB and 4G capability. Other hardware and software elements relatively remained the same.

== See also ==
- Infinix Mobile
- Infinix Hot S3
