= Itel A27 =

Budget smartphone by itel Mobile

itel A27
- Brand: itel Mobile
- Manufacturer: itel
- Series: A series
- First released: February 15, 2022
- Compatible networks: GSM, HSPA, LTE
- Form factor: Slate
- Colors: Crystal Blue, Deep Grey, Silver Purple
- Dimensions: 153 mm × 74.6 mm × 11 mm (6.02 in × 2.94 in × 0.43 in)
- Weight: 188.8 g (6.66 oz)
- Operating system: ItelOS 7.6.0 (Android 11 Go edition)
- System-on-chip: Unisoc SC9832E (28 nm)
- CPU: Quad-core 1.4 GHz Cortex-A53
- GPU: Mali-T820 MP1
- Memory: 2 GB LPDDR3
- Storage: 32 GB eMMC 5.1
- Removable storage: microSDXC (dedicated slot) up to 128 GB
- Battery: 4,000 mAh non-removable Li-Ion
- Rear camera: 5 MP, f/2.0 LED flash, HDR
- Front camera: 2 MP
- Display: 5.45 inches IPS LCD; 480 x 960 pixels, 18:9 ratio (~197 ppi density)
- Sound: Loudspeaker, 3.5mm jack
- Connectivity: Wi-Fi 802.11 b/g/n, hotspot Bluetooth 4.2, A2DP; GPS with A-GPS microUSB 2.0
- Data inputs: Fingerprint scanner (rear-mounted), accelerometer, proximity sensor

The Itel A27 is a budget Android smartphone manufactured, developed, and marketed by itel Mobile. It was released on February 15, 2022, in Inida and was available at 3 color options: Crystal Blue, Deep Gray, and Silver Purple.

The A27 comes with a 5.45-inch IPS LCD with a resoltution of 480 × 960 pixels. It has a single AI rear camera of 5 megapixels with aperture of f/2.0, and a front camera of 2 megaxixels.

It is powered by an unspecified quad-core 1.4 GHz processor (Unisoc SC9832E) paired with 2GB of RAM with mircroSC card expandable up to 128GB. It runs on Android 11 (Go Edition) with the ItelOS 7.6.0 interface.
