= Infinix Note 7 =

Infinix Note 7 series smartphone

Infinix Note 7 Lite Infinix Note 7
- Brand: Infinix Note
- Manufacturer: Infinix Mobile
- Type: Phablet
- Series: Note 7
- First released: 14 May 2020; 6 years ago
- Predecessor: Infinix Note 6
- Successor: Infinix Note 8
- Compatible networks: 2G, 3G, 4G, 4G LTE
- Form factor: Slate
- Dimensions: Note 7 Lite: 165.4 mm × 76.8 mm × 8.8 mm (6.51 in × 3.02 in × 0.35 in); Note 7: 173.4 mm × 79 mm × 8.8 mm (6.83 in × 3.11 in × 0.35 in)
- Weight: Note 7 Lite: 185 g (6.5 oz); Note 7: 206 g (7.3 oz)
- Operating system: Android 10 with XOS 6.0
- System-on-chip: Note 7 Lite: MediaTek Helio P22; Note 7: MediaTek Helio G70
- CPU: Helio: Octa-core (4x2.0 GHz Cortex-A53, 4x1.8 GHz Cortex-A53) and (2x2.0 GHz Cortex-A75, 6x1.7 GHz Cortex-A55)
- GPU: PowerVR GE8320; Mali-G52 2EEMC2
- Memory: Note 7 Lite: 4 GB RAM; Note 7: 4/6 GB RAM
- Storage: 64/128 GB
- Removable storage: microSD, expandable up to 256 GB (2 TB for Note 7)
- Battery: 5000 mAh
- Charging: 18W
- Rear camera: 48 MP, f/1.8, (wide), 1/2.0", 0.8 μm, PDAF + 2MP, 40mm macro, f/2.4 + 2MP (depth), f/2.4 + 2MP (dedicated video camera), f/1.8, QVGA, Quad LED flash, HDR, 1080p@30fps, panorama
- Front camera: Note 7 Lite: 8 MP, (wide); Note 7: 16 MP, f/2.0, 26mm (wide), 1/3.06", 1.0 μm; All: 1080p@30fps
- Display: 720 x 1600 (720 x 1640 for Note 7) 720p IPS LCD Infinity-O capacitive touchscreen; Note 7 Lite: 6.6 in (165.4 mm), (266 ppi); Note 7: 6.95 in (173.4 mm), (258 ppi)
- Sound: Loudspeaker; 3.5mm Headphone jack
- Connectivity: Bluetooth 5.0; Wi-Fi 802.11 a/b/g/n/ac USB 2.0
- Data inputs: Accelerometer; Fingerprint scanner; Gyroscope; Proximity sensor; Intelligent digital assistant; Face ID
- Model: X656 (Note 7 Lite); X690B (Note 7)
- Website: Infinix Note 7 Lite; Infinix Note 7

Infinix Note 7 Lite and Infinix Note 7 are Android-based smartphones manufactured, released and marketed by Infinix Mobile as a part of Infinix Note 7 series. The device were unveiled during an online event held on 14 May 2020 due to the COVID-19 pandemic as successors to Infinix Note 6 series. It is the seventh generation of Infinix's Note Series of smartphones.

Infinix Note 7 Lite and Infinix Note 7 are the upgraded version of Infinix smart 7 series, coming with different features, including the OS, camera, display, storage, and battery capacity.

Infinix Note 7 has received generally favorable reviews, with critics mostly noting the bigger battery capacity and better camera quality. Critics, however, criticize the HD+ resolution of the display and lack of USB Type-C port. The Infinix Note 7 is available in three different colour choices: Forest Green, Aether Black, and Bolivia Blue.

== Specifications ==
=== Hardware ===
Note 7 Lite features a 720p display with 20:9 aspect ratio, while Note 7 also features a 720p display but with 20.5:9 aspect ratio. Note 7 Lite features a display size of 6.6-inches, while Note 7 features a display size of 6.95-inches. Both of the devices have an IPS LCD capacitive touchscreen with a punch hole for front camera, while featuring a side-mounted fingerprint scanner with AI Face ID and the ability to record 1080p low-light video. Note 7 Lite comes with MediaTek Helio P22 SoC, while Note 7 comes with MediaTek Helio G70. Note 7 Lite comes with 4 GB of RAM, while Note 7 comes with two variants, consisting of 4 GB and 6 GB of RAM. Both of the devices come with two variants, consisting of 64 GB and 128 GB storage. Note 7 Lite features the ability to use a microSD card to expand the storage to a maximum of 256 GB, while Note 7 can be expanded up to 2 TB. Both of the devices come with 5000 mAh battery. Note 7 supports 18W fast charging, making it the first Infinix device to feature such. The cameras on the Note 7 series are improved considerably over their predecessors. Note 7 Lite has a triple rear camera setup with quad LED flash while Note 7 features a quad rear camera setup with quad LED flash.

=== Software ===
All the devices ship with Android 10 with new XOS 6.0, unlike the versions found on Note 6 series. The XOS 6.0 features Dark Mode, Digital Wellbeing, Wi-Fi Share and Smart Gesture.

== Reception ==
Mudassar Jehangir from PhoneYear gave a positive review of the Note 7, praising the battery capacity and the camera quality, while noting that it's a reasonably priced phone that can give the user an immersive display experience with the 720p resolution.

John Adebimitan from TekGoblin praised the Note 7 performance, display, battery and camera, noting that the device is worth the price in the middle to lower range of the market.

Note 7 received a positive review from Hamari Web. Praise was directed towards the storage, design, camera quality, performance, display, battery life and the new fast charging capacity with 18 watts.

Mara Anton from Techthelead called Note 7 a premium and remarked that the device "has the design and display size of a high-end phone, the audio to match it and a battery that's almost too good to be true. It's got a good camera with a pretty creative beauty department that will come in handy for your selfies and outfit of the day posts."

Note 7 received a positive review from Techmobile, noting that "upgrades are important, it is more interesting when it comes along with beauty." The reviewer also stated that "the device is indeed an incredible piece of hardware that is balanced in so many ways.

https://umobileprice.com/infinix-note-12-vip-price-in-pakistan/== References ==
