= Itel S24 =

2024 Android smartphone manufactured by Itel Mobile

- Manufacturer: Itel Mobile
- First released: April 2024
- Predecessor: Itel S23
- Successor: Itel S25
- Compatible networks: 2G / 3G / 4G
- Colors: Dawn White, Coastline Blue, Starry Black
- Dimensions: 163.5 h, 75.5 w, 8.3 d mm (6.44 x 2.97 x 0.33 in)
- Weight: 192 g (6.77 oz)
- Operating system: ItelOS 13.5.0 (Android 13)
- System-on-chip: Mediatek Helio G91 Ultra
- CPU: Octa-core (2x2.0 GHz Cortex-A75 & 6x1.8 GHz Cortex-A55)
- GPU: Mali-G52 MC2
- Storage: 128GB 4GB RAM; 128 or 256GB 8GB RAM
- SIM: Nano-SIM + eSIM or Nano-SIM + Nano-SIM
- Battery: Li-Po 5000 mAh
- Charging: 18W wired, bypass charging, 50% in 40 mins
- Rear camera: Single 108 MP, f/1.6, (wide), 1/1.67", 0.64μm, AF, 0.08 MP (auxiliary lens)
- Front camera: 8 MP

The Itel S24 is an entry-level of Android-based smartphones developed and manufactured by Itel Mobile. First announced on March 29, 2024, it was released in global and Indian markets on April 23, 2024, then in the Philippines on October 10 in that year, and has support of bypass charging.

== Specifications ==
=== Design ===
The Itel S24 has a similar design to the Itel S23. The phone case is typically made of a combination of thermoplastic polyurethane and polycarbonate.

=== Hardware ===
The Itel is equipped with the Mediatek Helio G91 Ultra chipset with the Octa-core (2x2.0 GHz Cortex-A75 & 6x1.8 GHz Cortex-A55) processor, and Mali-G52 MC2 for the graphics processor.

=== Display ===
The Itel S24 comes with a 90Hz IPS (In-Plane Switching) LCD at 480 nits, sizing at 6.6 inches, 104.6 cm^{2} (~84.8% screen-to-body ratio) and a resolution at 720 x 1612 pixels at a ratio of 20:9 (~267 ppi density).

=== Camera ===
The Itel S24 features a dual rear camera setup with a prominent 108 MP main camera featuring a Samsung HM6 ISOCELL sensor with a bright f/1.6 aperture.

The phone's front camera comes with an 8 MP module.

=== Software ===
The Itel S24 runs on Android 13 with the ItelOS 13.5.0 interface.

== See also ==
- Itel S23
