= Infinix Note 60 Pro =

Mid-range smartphone manufactured by Infinix Mobile

- Infinix Note 60 Pro in Deep Ocean Blue
- Brand: Infinix Mobile
- Manufacturer: Transsion (on contract)
- Type: Smartphone
- Series: Infinix Note Series
- First released: March 11, 2026; 8 months ago
- Related: Infinix Note 60; Infinix Note 60 Ultra
- Compatible networks: 5G, 4G LTE, 3G
- Form factor: Slate
- Operating system: Android 16 with XOS 16
- System-on-chip: Qualcomm Snapdragon 7s Gen 4
- CPU: Octa-core, 1x 2.7 GHz Cortex-A720 & 3x 2.4 GHz Cortex-A720 & 4x 1.8 GHz Cortex-A520
- GPU: Adreno 810
- Memory: 8 or 12 GB
- Storage: 128 or 256 GB
- Battery: 6,000 or 6,500 mAh
- Charging: 90 W wired, 30 W wireless
- Rear camera: 50 MP (primary); triple-camera system
- Display: 6.78-inch AMOLED, 144Hz, 2304Hz PWM, 700 nits (typ), 1600 nits (HBM), 4500 nits (peak); 1208 x 2644 pixels, 19.5:9 ratio (~429 ppi density) with Ultra HDR support
- Connectivity: 5G, Wi-Fi, Bluetooth 5.4, NFC, USB-C, IR blaster
- Website: infinixmobility.com/note-60-pro

The Infinix Note 60 Pro is a mid-range smartphone developed by Infinix Mobile, a subsidiary of Transsion Holdings. Part of the Infinix Note 60 series alongside the Note 60 and Note 60 Ultra, the device was previewed at CES 2026 in February 18, 2026 and officially released in March 11, 2026.

The Note 60 Pro is notable as the first Infinix Note-series device to use a Qualcomm Snapdragon chipset, having previously relied on MediaTek processors, and as part of the first Infinix smartphone lineup to support satellite communication.

== Design ==
The Note 60 Pro's rear panel houses a triple-camera module with an LED flash, as confirmed by filings with the United States Federal Communications Commission under model number X6848. Technology publications noted visual similarities between the camera module layout and that of the Apple iPhone 17 Pro and Apple iPhone 18 Pro.

Integrated into the camera module is a secondary rear-mounted dot-matrix display, branded by Infinix as the "Rear Matrix Display," designed to show the time, weather, and notification alerts without activating the main screen, and a halo LED light displayed at the top of the row. Technology journalists compared this feature to the Glyph interface used by Nothing Technology. The device is offered in six finishes except for Silk Green option that was removed from the color lineup:

Color	Name
	Deep Ocean Blue
	Mist Titanium
	Solar Orange
	Torino Black
	Mocha Brown
	Frost Silver

== Specifications ==
=== Hardware and display ===
The Note 60 Pro uses a 6.78 in (172 mm) AMOLED display with a 144 Hz refresh rate and a resolution described by Infinix as "1.5K." It is powered by the Qualcomm Snapdragon 7s Gen 4 system on a chip, a 5G-capable processor. This marked Infinix's first use of a Qualcomm chipset in its Note series, having previously used MediaTek processors. Memory configurations include 8 or 12 GB of RAM with 128 or 256 GB of internal storage.

The device contains a 6,500 mAh battery with support for 90 W wired and 30 W wireless charging. Infinix has claimed a six-year battery lifespan through what it terms "Battery Self-Healing Tech," described as chemical optimisations intended to slow degradation of battery capacity; these claims had not been independently verified as of February 2026. Audio is provided by dual stereo speakers tuned in collaboration with JBL.

=== Cooling system ===
The Infinix Note 60 Pro has its integrated 3D IceCore Vapor Chamber built in a 4,758mm^{2} copper sheet for improving thermal management and gaming experience.

=== Cameras ===
The primary rear camera uses a 50-megapixel sensor; full specifications for the secondary and tertiary cameras had not been disclosed as of February 2026. The phone is expected to run Android 16 with Infinix's XOS 16 interface.

=== Software ===
The Note 60 Pro runs on Android 16 with the XOS 16 user interface. Connectivity includes 5G, VoLTE, Wi-Fi, Bluetooth 5.4, NFC, USB-C, and an infrared blaster.

== Satellite communication ==
The Note 60 series was presented at CES 2026 as Infinix's first smartphone lineup with satellite communication capability. According to Infinix, the system uses a satellite modem capable of two-way voice calling and SMS messaging across approximately two-thirds of the Earth's surface, with automatic switching between terrestrial and satellite networks. Transmission speeds are limited to 4 Kbps. The Note 60 series received multiple "Best of CES 2026" recognitions from technology publications for this feature.

== Note 60 series ==
The Note 60 Pro is positioned between the standard Note 60 and the Note 60 Ultra within the Infinix Note 60 series. The Note 60 uses a MediaTek chipset and a smaller battery, while the Note 60 Ultra was developed in collaboration with Italian automotive design firm Pininfarina and targets a higher price segment.

Infinix Note 60 series comparison
Model	Chipset	Display	Battery	Charging
Note 60	MediaTek Dimensity 7400 Ultimate	6.78 in	5,000–6,000 mAh (est.)	45W wired, 30W wireless
Note 60 Pro	Qualcomm Snapdragon 7s Gen 4	6.78 in, 1.5K, 144 Hz AMOLED	6,500 mAh	90W wired, 30W wireless
Note 60 Ultra	MediaTek Dimensity 8400 Ultimate	6.78 in, 1.5K, 144 Hz AMOLED	Si/C Li-Ion 7000 mAh	100W wired, 50W wireless
