= Itel =

Itel may refer to:

- Hitachi Data Systems, founded as Itel
- Itel Mobile, a brand of Transsion Holdings
