= Infinix Hot 9 Pro =

Infinix smartphone released in June 2020

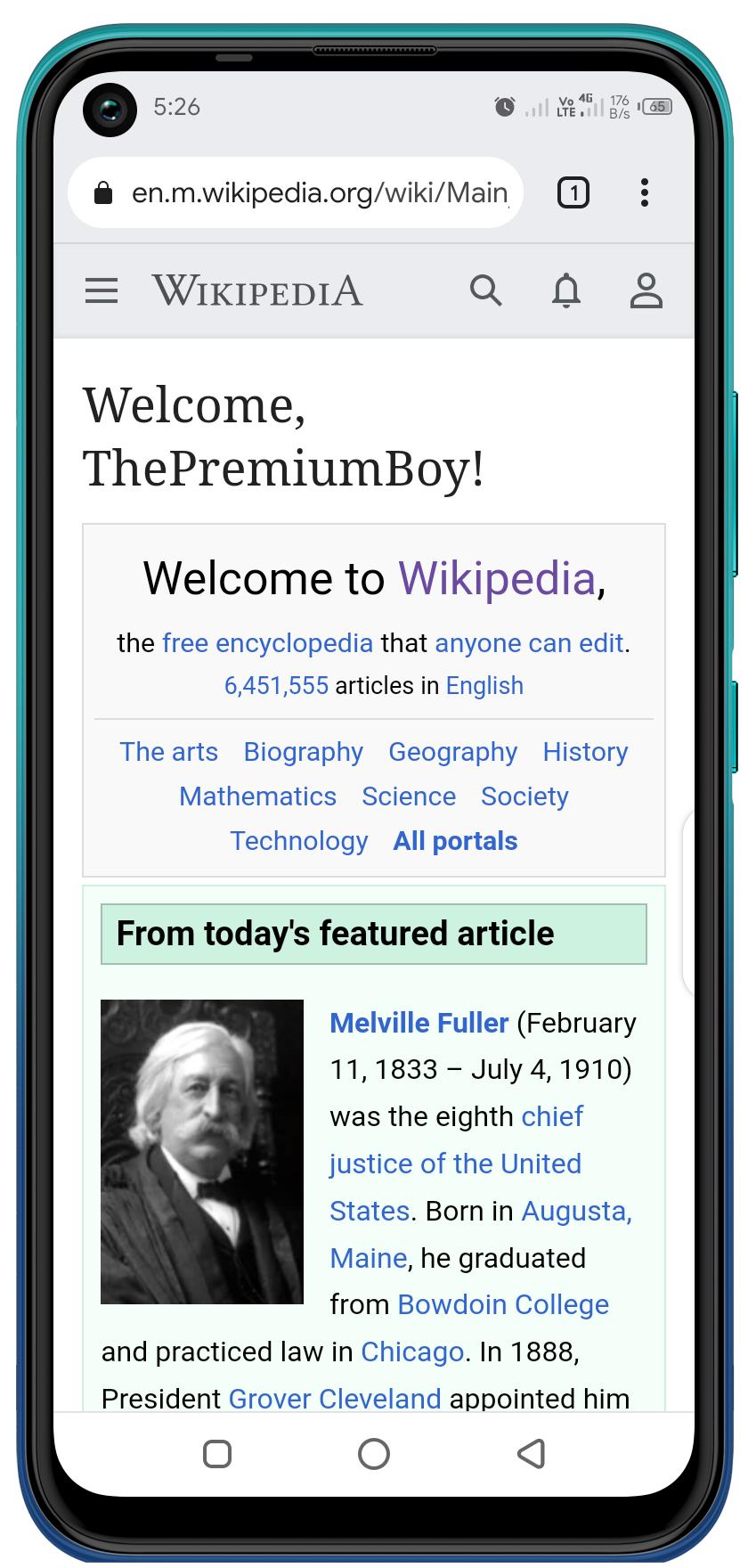
- Infinix Hot 9 Pro with Wikipedia screen
- Brand: Infinix Mobile
- Series: Infinix Hot series
- First released: June 2020
- Related: Infinix Hot 9
- Compatible networks: 2G; 3G; 4G LTE
- Dimensions: 165×76.8×8.7 mm (6.50×3.02×0.34 in)
- Weight: 185 g (6.53 oz)
- Operating system: Android 10 with XOS 6.0
- System-on-chip: Mediatek Helio P22
- CPU: Octa-core 2.0 GHz Cortex-A53
- GPU: PowerVR GE8320
- Memory: 4GB RAM
- Storage: 64GB internal storage
- SIM: Dual sim (Nano-SIM, dual stand-by)
- Battery: 5000 mAh Lithium polymer battery, non-removable
- Rear camera: Quad Camera: 48 MP + 2 MP + 2 MP +QVGA (Low light sensor); Features: Quad-LED flash, HDR, Panorama; Video: 1080p @ 30fps
- Front camera: Single Camera: 8 MP; Features: LED flash; Video: 1080p @ 30fps
- Display: Type: IPS LCD; Size: 6.6 inches; Resolution: 720 × 1600 pixels; PPI: ~266 ppi density; Ratio: 20:9
- Connectivity: Wi-Fi; GPS; Bluetooth; Wi-Fi Direct; Wi-Fi Hotspot; FM radio
- Data inputs: Sensors: Fingerprint sensor; Accelerometer; Gyroscope; Proximity sensor; Compass
- Model: X655F
- SAR: 0.99 W/kg (head) 0.84 W/kg (body)
- Website: https://www.infinixmobiles.in/products/hot-9-pro/

The Infinix Hot 9 Pro is an Android-based smartphone released in June 2020 by Infinix. It is a budget smartphone with Android 10. It comes with 4 GB RAM and 64 GB internal storage.

== Specifications ==
=== Main Camera ===
The Infinix Hot 9 Pro has a 48 MP camera, a 2 MP depth camera, a 2 MP macro camera and a QVGA (low light sensor) camera. It can record video in 1080p @ 30fps. It also has Quad-LED flash, HDR and panorama.

=== Selfie camera ===
The Infinix Hot 9 Pro has an 8 MP single selfie camera that can also record video in 1080p @ 30fps. It also has a LED flash.

=== Operating system ===
The Infinix Hot 9 Pro comes with Android 10 operating system based on XOS 6.0.

=== Hardware ===
The Infinix Hot 9 Pro has a Mediatek Helio P22 (12 nm) chipset, Octa-core 2.0 GHz Cortex-A53 CPU and PowerVR GE8320 GPU.

=== Memory ===
The Infinix Hot 9 Pro has 64GB internal storage and 4GB RAM. It also supports microSDXC card.

=== Battery ===
The Infinix Hot 9 Pro has a 5000 mAh lithium polymer non-removable battery.

=== Display ===
The Infinix Hot 9 Pro has a 6.6 inch IPS LCD with ~266 ppi density. Its resolution is 720 × 1600 pixels, and ratio is 20:9.

=== Body ===
The Infinix Hot 9 Pro's dimensions are 165 x 76.8 x 8.7 mm. Its weight is 185 g (6.53 oz) and it has plastic frame and plastic back.

=== Connectivity ===
The Infinix Hot 9 Pro supports Wi-Fi, Bluetooth, GPS, and FM Radio. It also supports 2G, 3G and 4G LTE LTE networks.

== See also ==
- Infinix Mobile
- XOS (operating system)
