= Infinix Hot S3 =

Android smartphone developed by Infinix Mobile

- Brand: Infinix
- Manufacturer: Infinix Mobile
- Type: Smartphone
- Series: Hot S
- First released: February 2016; 10 years ago
- Related: Infinix Hot S3 Pro
- Compatible networks: 2G; 3G; 4G
- Form factor: Slate
- Dimensions: 153×72.9×8.4 mm (6.02×2.87×0.33 in)
- Weight: 150 g (5.3 oz)
- Operating system: Android 8.1 "Oreo"
- System-on-chip: Qualcomm Snapdragon 430
- CPU: Octa-core 1.4 GHz Cortex-A53
- GPU: Adreno 505
- Memory: 3 GB RAM
- Storage: 32 GB
- SIM: Dual SIM (Nano-SIM, dual stand-by)
- Battery: Non-removable 4000 mAh Li-Polymer
- Charging: 10W charging
- Rear camera: 13 MP
- Front camera: 20 MP
- Display: 5.7 inches IPS LCD, 720 x 1440 pixels, ~282 ppi density
- Sound: Loudspeaker, 3.5 mm jack
- Connectivity: Wi-Fi, Wi-Fi Direct, Wi-Fi Hotspot, Bluetooth, GPS
- Model: Infinix X573
- Website: www.infinixmobility.com/smartphone/hot-s3/

The Infinix Hot S3 is an Android smartphone manufactured by Infinix Mobile. This phone was released in India in February 2016. It has a 13 MP rear camera and a 20 MP front camera. It has a 4000 mAh battery.

== Specifications ==
=== Hardware ===
The Infinix Hot S3 has a 5.7 inch IPS LCD with 720 x 1440 pixel resolution. It has pixel density of ~282 ppi. The phone measures 153 mm x 72.9 mm x 8.4 mm. It is powered by Qualcomm Snapdragon 430 soc. It has Octa-core 1.4 GHz Cortex-A53 CPU and Adreno 505 GPU. It comes with 3 GB RAM and 32 GB internal storage. It has 4000 mAh lithium polymer battery.

==== Cameras ====
The Infinix Hot S3 has a 13 MP rear camera. It also has a 20 MP front camera. Both the cameras can record video in 1080p in 30fps.

=== Software ===
The Infinix Hot S3 comes preinstalled with Android 8.1(Oreo).

=== Design ===
The Infinix Hot S3 comes in Blush Gold, Sandstone Black, Topaz Blue, Bordeaux Red and Brush Gold colors.
