= George Zhu =

Chinese businessman

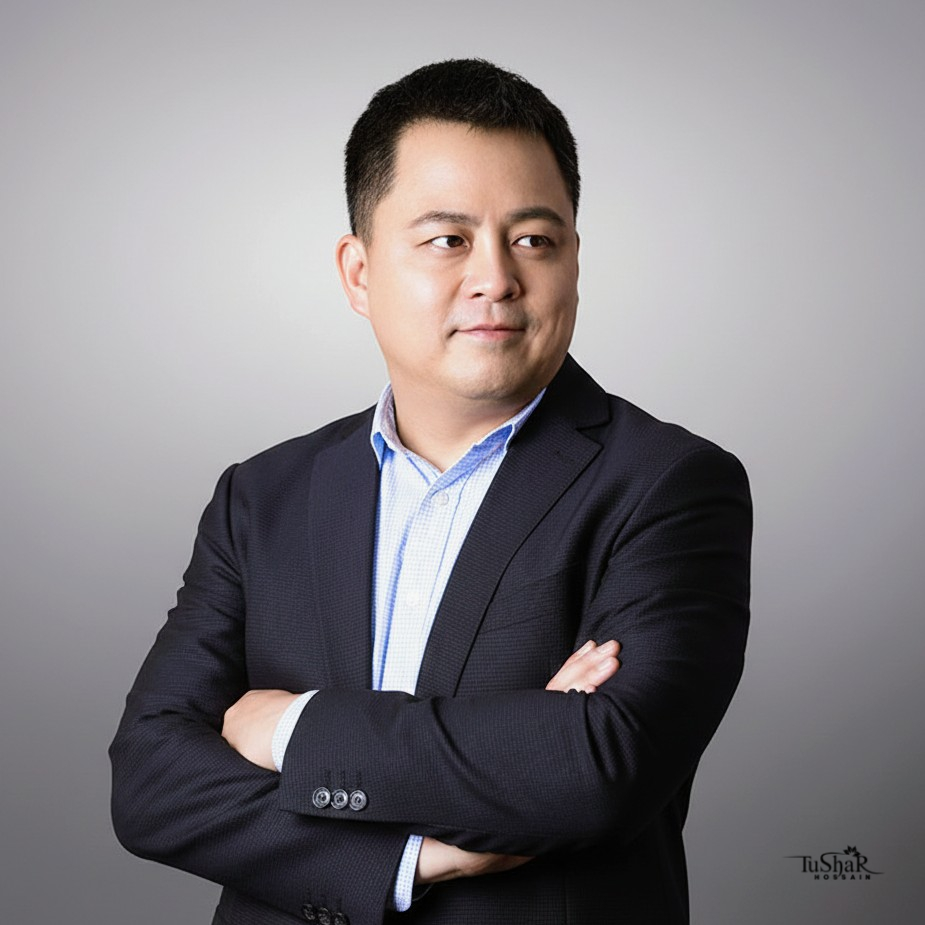
- Born: 1973 (age 52–53); China
- Occupation: Businessman
- Years active: 1996 - 2004 Ningbo Bird, 2005 - Transsion

George Zhu, also known as Zhu Zhaojiang (Chinese: 竺兆江; born 1973), is a Chinese businessman and president of Transsion Holdings.

== Biography ==
Zhu was born in 1973 in Fenghua in Zhejiang, China. When he was in middle school, he sold watches, drinks, and candy. Zhu majored in mechanical and electronic engineering at Nanchang Hangkong University where he graduated in 1992. He founded the Hong Kong-based firm Transsion, a company producing mobile phones and electronic appliances.
