= Infinix GT 20 Pro =

Smartphone model

- Brand: Infinix Mobile
- Manufacturer: Infinix Mobile
- Type: Smartphone
- Series: Infinix GT Series
- First released: April 28, 2024; 2 years ago
- Predecessor: Infinix GT 10 Pro
- Successor: Infinix GT 30 Pro
- Related: Infinix Zero 40
- Compatible networks: List: Technology: GSM / HSPA / LTE / 5G; 2G bands: GSM 850 / 900 / 1800 / 1900; 3G bands: HSDPA 850 / 900 / 1700(AWS) / 1900 / 2100; 4G bands (LTE): 1, 2, 3, 4, 5, 7, 8, 12, 17, 20, 28, 38, 40, 41, 42, 66; 5G bands: 1, 3, 5, 7, 8, 12, 20, 28, 38, 40, 41, 66, 77, 78 SA/NSA; Speed: HSPA, LTE, 5G
- Form factor: Slate
- Dimensions: 164.26 mm (6.467 in) H 75.43 mm (2.970 in) W 8.15 mm (0.321 in) D
- Weight: 194 g (6.8 oz)
- Operating system: Original: Android 14 with XOS 14 For GT; Current: Android 15 with XOS 15.1.2 For GT
- System-on-chip: MediaTek MT6896Z Dimensity 8200 Ultimate (4 nm)
- CPU: Octa-core (1x3.1 GHz Cortex-A78 & 3x3.0 GHz Cortex-A78 & 4x2.0 GHz Cortex-A55)
- GPU: Mali-G610 MC6
- Memory: 8 / 12 GB RAM (LPDDR5X)
- Storage: 256 GB (UFS 3.1)
- Removable storage: N/A
- SIM: Dual nano-SIM
- Battery: 5000 mAh
- Charging: 45W Super Charge, PD3.0
- Rear camera: Triple-Camera Setup; Primary: Samsung ISOCELL S5K(HM6); 108 MP (6P lens), f/1.75, 24mm (wide), FoV 83.63°, 1/1.67", 0.64 µm, AF, OIS; Macro: 2 MP, f/2.4, 1/5.0", 1.75 µm, FF; Depth: 2 MP, f/2.4, 1/5.0", 1.75 µm, FF; Camera features: Quad-LED flash, HDR, Panorama; Video recording: 4K@30/60fps, 1080p@30/60/120/240fps
- Front camera: GalaxyCore GC32E1; 32 MP (5P lens), f/2.2, 22mm (wide), FoV 88.9°, 1/3.1", 0.7 µm, FF; Camera features: Dual-LED flash; Video recording: 1440p@30fps, 1080p@30/60fps
- Display: 6.78 in (172 mm); 1080 x 2436 px resolution, 20:9 ratio (~388 ppi density); AMOLED, 1B colors, 144Hz, 2304Hz PWM, 1300 nits (peak)
- Sound: Stereo speakers (Tuned by JBL), 24-bit/192kHz Hi-Res audio
- Connectivity: Wi-Fi 802.11 a/b/g/n/ac/6, dual-band, Wi-Fi Direct
- Data inputs: Multi-touch screen; USB Type-C 2.0, OTG; Fingerprint scanner (under display, optical); Accelerometer; Proximity sensor; Compass; Gyroscope
- Water resistance: IP54 dust protected and water resistant (water splashes)
- Model: X6871
- Website: wap.ph.infinixmobility.com/gt-20-pro

Infinix GT 20 Pro is a midrange smartphone manufactured by Infinix Mobile that was unveiled in Riyadh on 28 April 2024. It is the successor to the Infinix GT 10 Pro.

The Infinix GT 20 Pro is an upgraded version of Infinix GT 10 Pro, coming with different features, including the OS, design and processor. The phones has received generally favorable reviews, with critics mostly noting the IP54 water/dust resistance, design and performance.

== Specifications ==
=== Hardware ===
As with the predecessor, Infinix GT 20 Pro features an AMOLED display with 1080p support and a display size of 6.78-inches and equipped with MediaTek Dimensity 8200 Ultimate and dedicated gaming chip Pixelworks x5 turbo.

It features LED light on the back alongside camera flash.

=== Software ===
The devices ship with Android 14 with XOS 14 For GT and will receive two major Android updates and three years of security updates. android 15

=== Battery ===
The battery itself has a capacity of 5000 mAh with 45W Fast Charging and features Bypass Charging feature which is suitable for gamers, especially competitive players.

=== Camera ===
The camera itself consists of a 108MP wide camera with OIS, 2MP macro and depth camera, and 32MP selfie camera. Rear camera video recording supports up to 4k 60fps while the front camera only reaches 2k 30fps.
