= Itel A60 =

Android budget smartphones manufactured by Itel Mobile

Itel A60 Itel A60s
- Manufacturer: Itel Mobile
- First released: A60: February 2023; A60s: July 2023 (India)
- Colors: A60: Dawn Blue, Vert Menthe, Sapphire Black; A60s: Shadow Black, Glacier Green, Moonlit Violet
- Operating system: A60: Android 12 (Go edition); A60s: Android 12
- CPU: Quad-core 1.4 GHz
- GPU: Mali-T820 MP1
- Memory: 2GB RAM (A60), 4GB RAM (A60s)
- Storage: A60: 32GB; A60s: 64GB/128GB
- Removable storage: microSDXC
- SIM: Dual SIM
- Battery: 5000 mAh
- Charging: 10W wired
- Rear camera: A60: Dual 8 MP 0.3 MP; A60s: Dual 8 MP (wide) 0.08 MP (auxiliary lens)
- Front camera: 5 MP
- Display: IPS LCD; 6.6 inches; 720 x 1612 resoluion (20:9 ratio); 267 ppi
- Data inputs: Rear-mounted fingerprint, accelerometer, proximity
- Website: https://www.itel-life.com/ng/products/phone/a-series/a60

The itel A60 is a series of Android budget smartphones developed and manufactured by Itel Mobile. It was first announced in 2022. In February 2023, the initial release in Nigeria with Airtel commenced, followed by India in March 2023.

The itel A60s was officially available in July 2023 in India.

The A60 is powered by the 28nm Unisoc SC9832E chipset, while the A60S is powered by the 22nm Unisoc SC9863A1 chipset. Both smartphones feature a 5000 mAh battery, the same display, and an 8 MP main camera and a 5 MP front camera. As for other budget phones, both the main and front cameras can record a 720p video at 30 fps.

== See also ==
- Itel A50
- Itel Mobile
