= Itel A50 =

Smartphone series by Itel Mobile

Itel A50 Itel A50C
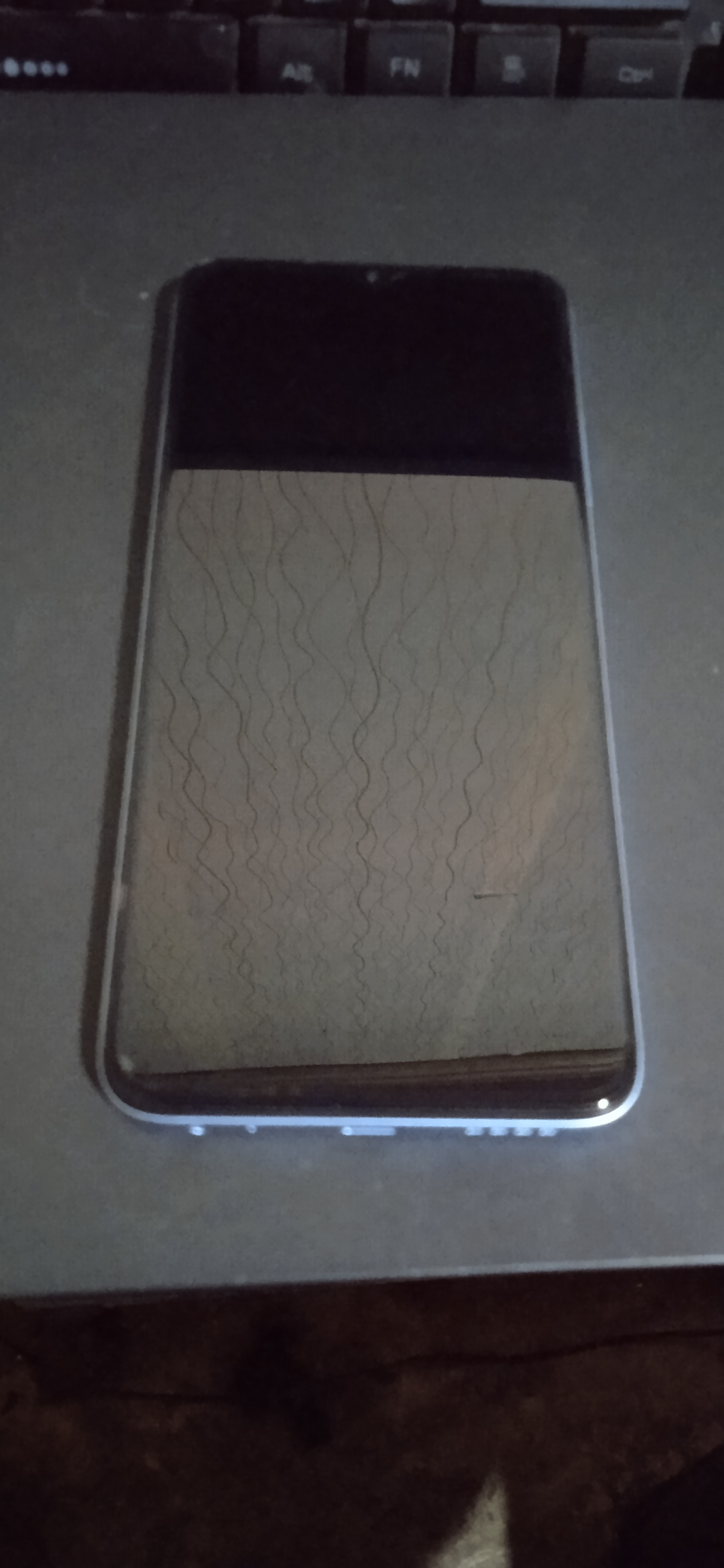
- Manufacturer: Itel Mobile
- Series: Itel A series
- First released: May 2024 (A50); August 12, 2024 (A50C)
- Compatible networks: 4G LTE
- Colors: Shimmer Gold, Суаn Blue, Lime Green, Misty Black (A50); Dawn Blue, Sapphire Black, Misty Aqua (A50C)
- Dimensions: 163.9 x 75.7 x 8.7 mm (A50); 163.9 x 75.7 x 9.4 mm (A50C)
- Operating system: ItelOS 14.0.1 (Android 14 Go Edition)
- System-on-chip: Unisoc T603
- CPU: Octa-core
- GPU: PowerVR GE8322 / IMG8322
- Storage: 64GB/128GB (A50); 32GB (A50C)
- Battery: 5,000 mAh (A50); 4,000 mAh (A50C)
- Charging: 10W wired
- Rear camera: Double 8 MP auxiliary lens (A50); Single 8 MP, AF (A50C)
- Front camera: 5 MP
- Display: 6.56 inches, 103.4 cm2

The Itel A50 is a series of Android-based smartphones developed and manufactured by Itel Mobile. It was first announced and released in the Philippines in June 2024 for the A50 4G, and in August 2024 for the A50C.

The Itel A50 and A50C was officially launched in Pakistan and Indonesia in July 2024 and in India in August 2024. However, it was released earlier in other markets, such as African countries.

== Specifications ==
=== Design ===
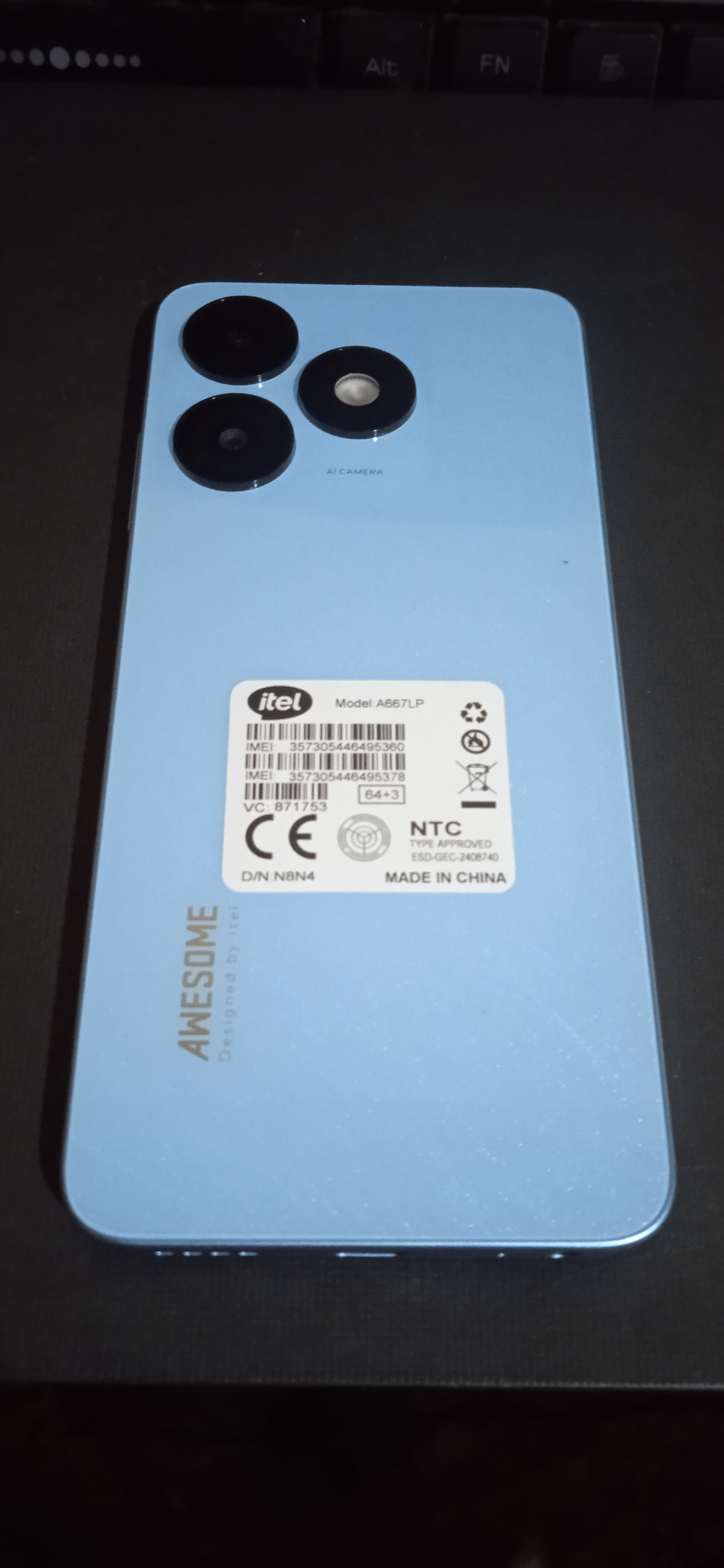
Itel A50 rear

The Itel A50 and A50C features a glossy texture in the back panel, and was available in multiple color options depening on the model:

Color options comparison
Itel A50 (4 colors)	Itel A50C (3 colors)
Shimmer Gold, Суаn Blue, Lime Green, and Misty Black	Dawn Blue, Sapphire Black, and Misty Aqua

=== Processor ===
The itel A50 and A50C was powered with an octa-core with Unisoc T603 chipset and a PowerVR GE8322 / IMG8322 graphics processor.

=== Display ===
The itel A50 featured a 6.6-inch IPS LCD display with a 720 x 1612 px resolution, 60Hz refresh rate, and a 20:9 aspect ratio. It has an 8.7 mm thickness, which is 0.1 mm.

It also featured the screen-to-body ratio of 84.3%.

=== Battery ===
The A50's, battery which is not removable, has a capacity of 5000 mAh and the A50C has a lower battery capacity, which is 4000 mAh.

The charging cable is a USB Type-C 2.0 port.

=== Camera ===
==== Rear ====
The camera's shape design is rectangular. The itel A50 features an 8-megapixel (8 MP) auxiliary lens "AI Dual Rear Camera", while the A50C has a singular main camera with the same 8 MP module.

==== Front/Selfie ====
Both phones features a 5 MP front camera.

=== Storage ===
==== A50 ====
The itel A50 comes with 64GB or 128GB configuration with 2/3/4GB RAM memory.

==== A50C ====
The itel A50C only comes with a 32GB configuration with 2GB RAM memory.
