= XOS (operating system) =

Android operating system by Infinix Mobility

- The Logo of XOS

- Screenshot of Infinix XOS home screen, running on a Infinix Note 60 Pro
- Developer: Infinix Mobile
- Written in: C
- OS family: Android
- Working state: Current
- Source model: Closed-source
- Initial release: December 2015; 10 years ago
- Latest release: 16.3.0.160SP05 (Based on Android 16) / 6 November 2026; 1 day ago
- Marketing target: Smartphones, tablet computers
- Available in: 86+ languages
- List of languages: Azərbaycan (latın) – Azerbaijani (Latin); Bosanski (latinica) – Bosnian (Latin); Català – Catalan; Čeština – Czech; Dansk – Danish; Deutsch – German; Eesti – Estonian; English – English; English (United States) – English (United States); Español (Estados Unidos) – Spanish (United States); Español – Spanish; Esperanto – Esperanto; Euskara – Basque; Filipino (Pilipinas) – Filipino (Philippines); Français – French; Gaeilge – Irish; Galego – Galician; Hausa – Hausa; Hrvatski – Croatian; Indonesia – Indonesian; Íslenska – Icelandic; Italiano – Italian; Latviešu – Latvian; Lietuvių – Lithuanian; Kiswahili – Swahili; Magyar – Hungarian; Melayu – Malay; Nederlands – Dutch; Norsk bokmål – Norwegian Bokmål; O‘zbek (lotin) – Uzbek (Latin); Oromoo – Oromo; Polski – Polish; Português – Portuguese; Română – Romanian; Shqip – Albanian; Slovenčina – Slovak; Slovenščina – Slovenian; Suomi – Finnish; Svenska – Swedish; Tiếng Việt – Vietnamese; Türkçe – Turkish; Türkmen dili – Turkmen; Ελληνικά – Greek; Български – Bulgarian; Кыргызча – Kyrgyz; Қาзақ тілі – Kazakh; Македонски – Macedonian; Русский – Russian; Српски (ћирилица) – Serbian (Cyrillic); Українська – Ukrainian; Հայերեն – Armenian; ქართული – Georgian; עברית – Hebrew; اردو – Urdu; العربية – Arabic; فارسی – Persian; پښتو – Pashto; کوردیی ناوەندی – Central Kurdish/Sorani Kurdish; سنڌي – Sindhi; ئۇيغۇرچە – Uyghur; ትግርኛ – Tigrinya; အမေရိကန် – Burmese Script Variation / Regional Variant; አማርኛ – Amharic; नेपाली – Nepali; मराठी – Marathi; हिन्दी – Hindi; ਪੰਜਾਬੀ – Punjabi; অসমীয়া – Assamese; বাংলা – Bangla; ગુજરાતી – Gujarati; ଓଡ଼ିଆ – Odia; தமிழ் – Tamil; తెలుగు – Telugu; ಕನ್ನಡ – Kannada; Malayalam (മലയാളം) – Malayalam; සිංහල – Sinhala; ไทย – Thai; ລາວ – Lao; မြန်မာ – Burmese; မွနျမာ (Qaag) – Burmese (Qaag); ខ្មែរ – Khmer; 한국어 – Korean; 日本語 – Japanese; 简体中文 – Simplified Chinese; 繁體中文 – Traditional Chinese
- Update method: Over-the-air
- Official website: infinixmobility.com/xos

XOS is an Android-based operating system developed by Hong Kong–based Chinese mobile phone manufacturer Infinix Mobile, a subsidiary of Transsion Holdings. The operating system is developed for use in the company's smartphones and tablet computers.

Debuted initially as XUI in 2015, the operating system changed its name to XOS in 2016. Claims from the company about unique user customization capabilities are made. As with the original Android OS, XOS supports a wide range of customizations to the system interface.

The original XUI 1.0 is based on Android 5.1. Later releases are based on newer Android operating systems. The operating system includes pre-installed applications in all of its versions.

Infinix XOS 16.3.0 running on phone and tablet

== History ==
=== Version history ===
Version	Initial release	Android OS	Codename	Notes	References
1.0	2015	5.1 Lollipop	-	Named "XUI" in this initial version	
2.0	2016	6.0 Marshmallow	Chameleon	Renamed to "XOS"	
2.0	2016	7.0 Nougat	Chameleon	Renamed to "XOS"	
2.2	2016	7.0 Nougat	Chameleon	Renamed to "XOS"	
3.0	2017	7.0 Nougat	Hummingbird		
3.0	2017	7.0 Nougat 8.1.0 Oreo	Hummingbird		
3.2	2017	7.0 Nougat 8.1.0 Oreo	Hummingbird		
4.0	2018	7.0 Nougat 8.1.0 Oreo	Honeybee		
4.0	2018	8.1.0 Oreo	Honeybee		
4.1	2018	8.1.0 Oreo	Honeybee		
5.0	2019	9 Pie	Cheetah		
5.0.2	2019	9 Pie	Cheetah		
5.5	2019	9 Pie	Cheetah		
5.5.2	2019	9 Pie	Cheetah		
6.0	2020	10	Dolphin		
6.1	2020	10	Dolphin		
6.2	2020	10	Dolphin		
7.0	2020	10	Dolphin		
7.1	2020	10	Dolphin		
7.5	2021	11	Dolphin		
7.6	2021	11	Dolphin		
10.0	2021	11	-		
10.0.LITE	2022	11	Dolphin		
10.6	2022	11	-		
10.6	2022	12	-		
12.0	2022	12	-		
12.6	2023	13	-		
13.x.x	2023	13	-		
14.x.x	2024	14	-		
15.x.x	2025	15	-		
16.x.x	2026	16	-		

== See also ==
- Android, the operating system XOS is based on
- HiOS, Transsion's other Android skin similar to XOS and itelOS
- List of custom Android distributions
- Android version history
