= Infinix Mobile =

Smartphone manufacturer based in Hong Kong

Infinix Mobility Limited
- Trade name: Infinix Mobility
- Type: Subsidiary
- Industry: Mobile phones
- Founded: April 2013; 13 years ago
- Founder: Transsion
- Headquarters: * New Territories, Hong Kong (registered office): Shenzhen, China (Operational headquarters)
- Area served: Africa (except Eritrea, Namibia and South Africa); Southeast Asia; South Asia; Middle East; Latin America; France; Poland; Czech Republic; Romania; Russia; Ukraine
- Key people: Benjamin Jiang (founder & CEO)
- Products: Smartphones; Tablet computers Earphones; Powerbanks; Phone cases Bags; Smart TVs; Smartwatches; Laptops
- Parent: Transsion Holdings
- Website: infinixmobility.com

Infinix Mobile is a Hong Kong–based Chinese smartphone company, founded in April 2013 by Transsion.

The company has research and development centers in Africa and China and designs their phones in Nigeria. Infinix Mobile is available in Asia and approximately 30 countries in the Middle East and Africa. The company was also the first brand of smartphones to be manufactured in Pakistan.

Its operating system, XOS, remains closed source.

== History ==
In 2017, the company saw an increase in market share in Egypt, positioning itself as the third-largest brand after Samsung and Huawei.

Infinix was a sponsor of the Indian Super League team Mumbai City during the 2017–2018 season.

On May 8, 2018, Infinix Mobile Nigeria entered an endorsement agreement with musician Davido to serve as the brand's ambassador in Nigeria.

In June 2020, Infinix Mobility introduced its first range of smart TVs to the Nigerian electronics market.

== Products ==
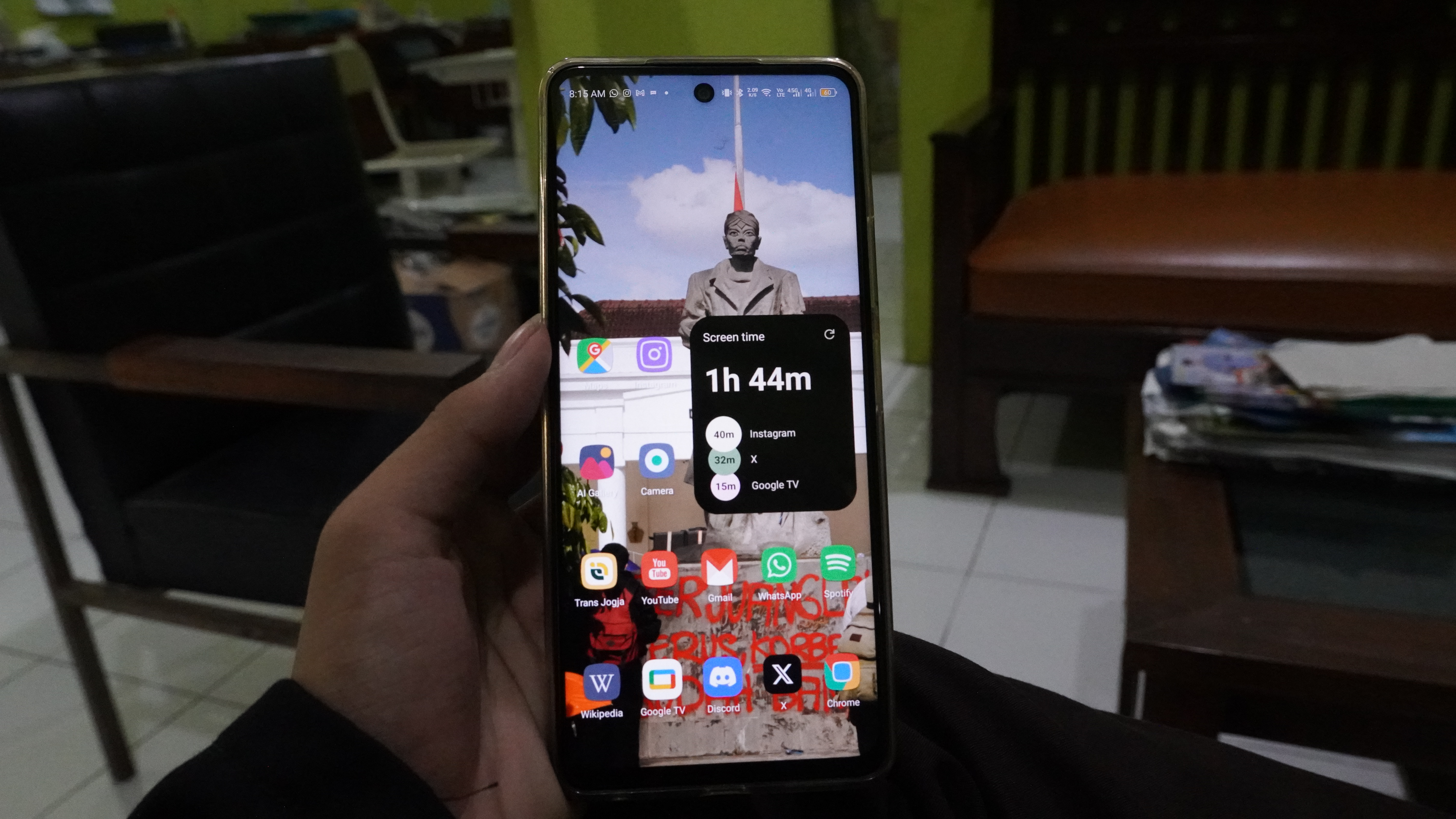
Infinix HOT 50 4G, one of the smartphones released by Infinix

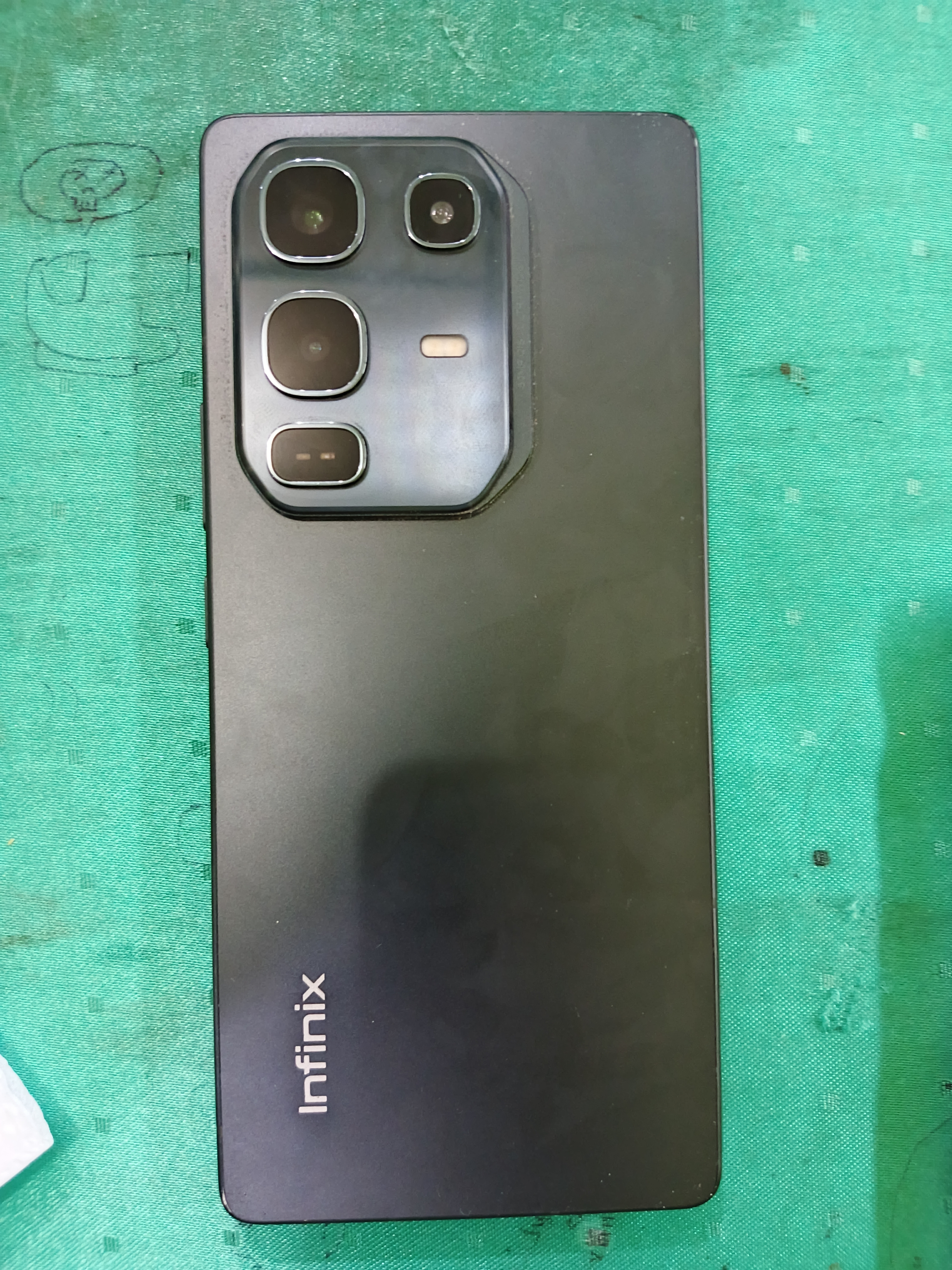
Infinix Note 50 Pro 4G, one of the phones released by Infinix in the Note series

List of Infinix mobile phones:

=== Phones ===
==== ZERO Series ====
- Infinix Zero
- Infinix Zero 2
- Infinix Zero 3
- Infinix Zero 4
  - Infinix Zero 4 Plus
- Infinix Zero 5
  - Infinix Zero 5 Pro
- Infinix Zero 6
  - Infinix Zero 6 Pro
- Infinix Zero 8
  - Infinix Zero 8i
- Infinix Zero 9
- Infinix Zero X
  - Infinix Zero X Pro
  - Infinix Zero X Neo
- Infinix Zero 5G
- Infinix Zero 20
- Infinix Zero 5G 2023
- Infinix Zero Ultra
- Infinix Zero 30
- Infinix Zero 30 5G
- Infinix Zero 40
- Infinix Zero 40 5G
- Infinix Zero Flip

==== NOTE series ====
- Infinix Hot Note
- Infinix Note 2
- Infinix Note 3
  - Infinix Note 3 Pro
- Infinix Note 4
  - Infinix Note 4 Pro
- Infinix Note 5
  - Infinix Note 5 Stylus
- Infinix Note 6
- Infinix Note 7
  - Infinix Note 7 Lite
- Infinix Note 8
  - Infinix Note 8i
- Infinix Note 9
- Infinix Note 10
  - Infinix Note 10 Pro
- Infinix Note 11
  - Infinix Note 11 Pro
    - Infinix Note 11 Pro NFC
  - Infinix Note 11i
  - Infinix Note 11s
- Infinix Note 12
  - Infinix Note 12 5G
  - Infinix Note 12 Pro
    - Infinix Note 12 Pro 5G
  - Infinix Note 12 G96
  - Infinix Note 12i
    - Infinix Note 12i 2022
  - Infinix Note 12 2023
  - Infinix Note 12 VIP
- Infinix Note 30
  - Infinix Note 30 Pro
  - Infinix Note 30 5G
  - Infinix Note 30 VIP
  - Infinix Note 30i
- Infinix Note 40
  - Infinix Note 40 5G
  - Infinix Note 40 Pro
    - Infinix Note 40 Pro 5G
    - Infinix Note 40 Pro+ 5G
  - Infinix Note 40X 5G
  - Infinix Note 40S
  - Infinix Note 40 Series Racing Edition
- Infinix Note 50
  - Infinix Note 50 Pro
  - Infinix Note 50 Pro+ 5G
  - Infinix Note 50X 5G+
  - Infinix Note 50S 5G+
- Infinix Note Edge
- Infinix Note 60
  - Infinix Note 60 Pro
  - Infinix Note 60 Ultra

==== HOT series ====
- Infinix Hot Note
- Infinix Hot 2
- Infinix Hot 3
- Infinix Hot S
- Infinix Hot 4
  - Infinix Hot 4 Pro
- Infinix Hot 5
  - Infinix Hot 5 Lite
- Infinix Hot S3
- Infinix Hot 6
  - Infinix Hot 6 Pro
  - Infinix Hot 6X
- Infinix Hot 7
  - Infinix Hot 7 Pro
- Infinix Hot 8
- Infinix Hot 9
  - Infinix Hot 9 Play
  - Infinix Hot 9 Pro
- Infinix Hot 10
  - Infinix Hot 10i
  - Infinix Hot 10T
  - Infinix Hot 10s
    - Infinix Hot 10s NFC
  - Infinix Hot 10 Lite
  - Infinix Hot 10 Play
- Infinix Hot 11
  - Infinix Hot 11 Play
  - Infinix Hot 11s
  - Infinix Hot 11 2022
- Infinix Hot 12
  - Infinix Hot 12 Play
  - Infinix Hot 12 Pro
  - Infinix Hot 12i
- Infinix Hot 20
  - Infinix Hot 20 Play
  - Infinix Hot 20s
  - Infinix Hot 20 5G
  - Infinix Hot 20i
- Infinix Hot 30
  - Infinix Hot 30i
  - Infinix Hot 30i NFC
  - Infinix Hot 30 Play
  - Infinix Hot 30 5G
- Infinix Hot 40
  - Infinix Hot 40i
  - Infinix Hot 40 Pro
- Infinix Hot 50
  - Infinix Hot 50i
  - Infinix Hot 50 5G
  - Infinix Hot 50 Pro
  - Infinix Hot 50 Pro+
- Infinix Hot 60
  - Infinix Hot 60i
  - Infinix Hot 60 5G+
  - Infinix Hot 60 Pro
  - Infinix Hot 60 Pro+
- Infinix Hot 70
  - Infinix Hot 70 Pro

==== S series ====
- Infinix Hot S
- Infinix S2
- Infinix Hot S3
  - Infinix S3X
- Infinix S4
- Infinix S5
  - Infinix S5 Lite
  - Infinix S5 Pro

==== SMART series ====
- Infinix Smart
- Infinix Smart 2
- Infinix Smart 2 HD
- Infinix Smart 2 Pro
- Infinix Smart 3
- Infinix Smart 3 Plus
- Infinix Smart 4c
- Infinix Smart 4
- Infinix Smart 5
- Infinix Smart 6
- Infinix Smart 6 HD
- Infinix Smart 6 Plus
- Infinix Smart 7
- Infinix Smart 7 HD
- Infinix Smart 8
- Infinix Smart 8 HD
- Infinix Smart 8 Pro
- Infinix Smart 8 Plus
- Infinix Smart 9
- Infinix Smart 9 HD
- Infinix Smart 10
- Infinix Smart 10 Plus
- Infinix Smart 10 Pro
- Infinix Smart 10 HD
- Infinix Smart 20
- Infinix Smart 20e

==== GT series ====
- Infinix GT 10 Pro
- Infinix GT 20 Pro
- Infinix GT 30 Pro
- Infinix GT 30 5G
- Infinix GT 50 Pro

=== Laptop ===
==== Inbook series ====
- Infinix Inbook XI Slim
- Infinix Inbook X1
- Infinix Inbook X2
- Infinix Inbook X3
- Infinix Inbook Air
- Infinix Inbook (2025)

==== Zerobook series ====
- Infinix Zerobook

==== GT series ====
- Infinix GT Book

=== Tablets ===
==== XPad series ====
- Infinix XPad 10
- Infinix XPad GT
- Infinix XPad Edge
- Infinix XPad 20
- Infinix XPad 20 Pro
- Infinix XPad 30E
- Infinix XPad 30 Pro

=== Accessories ===
==== MagPower series ====
- Infinix MagPower (XPower Go)
- Infinix MagPower 5
- Infinix MagPower Hub (Discontinued)
- Infinix MagPower Turbo
- Infinix MagPower Speaker

==== MagPad Series ====
- Infinix MagPad (15W) (2024)
- Infinix MagPad (20W) (2024)
- Infinix MagPad Car Charger (20W)
- Infinix MagPad (20W) (2025)
- Infinix MagPad (30W) (2025)
- Infinix MagPad (30W) (2026)

==== GT MagCharge Cooler series ====
- Infinix GT MagCooler (GT 20 Pro)
- Infinix GT MagCharge Cooler (GT 30 Pro)
- Infinix GT MagCooler (GT 30 5G)
- Infinix GT MagCharge Cooler 2.0 (GT 50 Pro)

==== AIoT series ====
- Infinix AI Buds
- Infinix AI Ring
- Infinix AI Glasses

==== XPencil Series ====
- XPencil 20

==== Wearables ====
===== GT Watch series =====
- Infinix GTWatch 5 Pro
- Infinix XWatch 3 GT

===== XWatch series =====
- Infinix XWatch N5 Pro
- Infinix XWatch H5 Pro
- Infinix XWatch N4 Pro
- Infinix XWatch N4
- Infinix XWatch H4
- Infinix XWatch 3
- Infinix XWatch 3 Plus
- Infinix XWatch 3 WE
- Infinix XWatch 3 Chic
- Infinix XWatch Pods

===== Watch series =====
- Infinix Watch GT Pro
- Infinix Watch S5
- Infinix Watch Pro
- Infinix Watch 1
- Infinix Watch XW2

===== Band series =====
- Infinix XBand

==== TV ====
===== X series =====
- Infinix TV X6G Pro
- Infinix TV X5W
- Infinix TV X5L 43”
- Infinix TV 43X3
- Infinix TV X3
- Infinix TV X1

===== Y series =====
- Infinix TV Y1
- Infinix 32Y1
- Infinix 32Y1A
- Infinix 24Y1
- Infinix 43Y1

===== Zero series =====
- Infinix Zero 55X3 QLED
- Infinix Zero 55 QLED

==== Hair Dryers ====
- Infinix High Speed Hair Dryer

==== Power Banks ====
===== GT Power series =====
- Infinix GTPower Pod 10K
- Infinix GT Power

===== XPower series =====
- Infinix XPower Go (MagPower)
- Infinix XPower 05 (XP05)
- Infinix XPower 10 Pro
- Infinix XPower 10 Go

==== TWS ====
===== GTBuds series =====
- GTBUDS 5
- GTBUDS 4
- GTBUDS 3

===== XBuds series =====
- XBUDS H5
- XBUDS N5
- XBUDS N4 Pro
- XBUDS 3 Loop
- XBUDS 3 WE
- XBUDS 3 GT
- XBUDS 3
- XBUDS 3 Lite

===== Buds series =====
- AI BUDS
- BUDS Lite
- BUDS NC

===== XE series =====
- XE 25
- XE 27
- XE22

===== ZClip series =====
- ZCLIP

==== Chargers ====
- 68W GaN Fast Charger (Gen2)
- 68W GaN Fast Charger
- 33W GaN Fast Charger
- XC02

==== Phone & Tablet Cases ====
===== PhoneCase series =====
- Infinix PhoneCase B2 (NOTE 50 Pro+)
- Infinix PhoneCase D1 Black (NOTE 50 Pro)
- Infinix PhoneCase Green (NOTE 50 Pro)
- Infinix PhoneCase B1 (NOTE 50 Pro)
- Infinix PhoneCase B2 Brown (NOTE 50 Pro)
- Infinix PhoneCase Multilayer (HOT 60 Pro)

===== XPadCase series =====
- Infinix XPad 20 Keyboard & Case
- Infinix XPad 10 Keyboard & Case
- Infinix XPad 10 Silicone Protective Cover

==== Bags ====
- Infinix Chest Bag
- Infinix PUBG Bag
- Infinix Limited Edition Backpack
- Infinix Limited Edition Black Backpack

==== Hats ====
- Infinix NOTE 50 Series CODM Limited Edition Bucket Hat

==== Tumblers ====
- Infinix NOTE Edge Tumbler

== See also ==
- XOS (operating system)
