= Transsion =

Chinese smartphone company

Shenzhen Transsion Holdings Ltd.

- The Transsion Building, the group HQ in Shenzhen, China
- Trade name: Transsion
- Native name: 深圳传音控股有限公司
- Formerly: Transsion Technology
- Type: Public company
- Traded as: SSE: 688036; CSI A100
- Industry: Consumer electronics
- Founded: 2006; 20 years ago in Hong Kong
- Founder: George Zhu
- Headquarters: Shenzhen, China
- Area served: Africa; Latin America; Middle East; South Asia; Southeast Asia
- Key people: Zhu Zhaojiang (Chairman and General Manager); Xiao Yonghui (Chief Financial Officer); Zhang Qi (Deputy General Manager); Yang Hong (Deputy General Manager)
- Products: Smartphones; Mobile accessories; Home appliances
- Revenue: ▼US$9.11 billion (2025)
- Net income: ▼US$358.4 million (2025)
- Total assets: ▼US$6.34 billion (FY2025)
- Subsidiaries: TECNO; itel; Infinix; Oraimo; Syinix; Carlcare
- Website: transsion.com

Transsion (Chinese: 传音控股; pinyin: Chuányīn Kònggǔ) is a Chinese manufacturer of mobile phones based in Shenzhen. It was the largest smartphone manufacturer by sales in Africa in 2017, and also sells mobile phones in the Middle East, Southeast Asia, South Asia, and Latin America. Its brands include phone brands such as itel, TECNO, Infinix; after-sales service brand Carlcare and accessories brand Oraimo and Syinix. It manufactures phones in Bangladesh, China, Ethiopia, India, Indonesia, and Pakistan.

== History ==
Transsion was founded as Transsion Technology in Hong Kong in 2006, with a focus on the development, manufacturing, sales, and services of mobile communication products. Transsion entered the African market with its TECNO and itel brands, and started focusing on the African market in July 2008, initially with feature phones. Transsion released its first smartphone in 2014.

Transsion set up its Nigerian subsidiary in June 2008, and had subsidiaries in seven countries in Africa by October that year. Transsion set up a manufacturing plant in Ethiopia in 2011. Transsion entered the Indian market in 2016. The market share of Transsion's smartphone brands in Africa combined surpassed that of Samsung in 2017, making Transsion the largest manufacturer of smartphones for the African market in the fourth quarter of 2017. Transsion was also the largest manufacturer of mobile phones in Africa in the first half of 2017. Transsion's 2018 attempt at a reverse takeover failed. In October 2018, Transsion Holdings started producing smartphones in their new manufacturing plant in Bangladesh. Transsion Holdings became a public listed company in September 2019 by listing on the STAR Market section of the Shanghai Stock Exchange.

In Q2 2023, Transsion became one of the top 5 smartphone vendors in the world, shipping 22.7 million smartphones to garner 9% market share.

== Operations ==
Transsion sells mobile phones in Africa, West Asia, Southeast Asia, South Asia, and South America. It operates mobile phone brands TECNO, itel, and Infinix, as well as after-sales support service Carlcare and accessories brand Oraimo and Syinix. Transsion manufactures its phones in China, Ethiopia, Bangladesh, India, and Pakistan. Transsion has after-sales support network in Africa.

In 2021, Transsion held a 48.2% share of the African smartphone market. Transsion's success in the African market has been attributed to tailoring its phones' features to the needs of the African market. Transsion's phones offer a feature that calibrates camera exposures for darker skin tones, allowing face details to be retained. The phones included support for African languages, including Amharic and Swahili. Tecno was the first major mobile phone brand in Ethiopia to include support for an Amharic keyboard. Other Transsion features designed for use in Africa include multiple SIM slots, long battery life, FM radio, and improvements to help withstand harsh weather.

Transsion manufactures inexpensive mobile phones in Ethiopia, which has been a contributing factor in Ethiopia's high rate of cell phone use.

Transsion's music streaming service Boomplay comes pre-installed in their phones. As of the middle of 2020, Boomplay had 75 million users in Africa.

Transsion is among the fastest growing smartphone brands in India, with a YoY growth of 40% in 2019. It was also the number one brand in India's entry-level smartphone market. Transsion's mobile phones are mostly entry-level to lower middle-range.
