= Itel Mobile =

Smartphone manufacturer based in Hong Kong

Itel Mobile Limited
- Newer logo first used in Indonesia since 5 October 2023
- Trade name: itel life
- Type: Subsidiary
- Industry: Consumer electronics
- Founded: 2007; 19 years ago
- Headquarters: New Territories, Hong Kong (registered office); Shenzhen, China (Operational headquarters)
- Area served: Worldwide
- Key people: Lei Weiguo (founder & CEO)
- Products: Mobile phones, tablets, television sets, laptops, accessories
- Parent: Transsion Holdings
- Website: itel-life.com

itel Mobile is a Hong Kong–based Chinese smartphone manufacturer company that belongs to Transsion Holdings. The brand was established in 2007.

== History ==
The first logo of itel Mobile

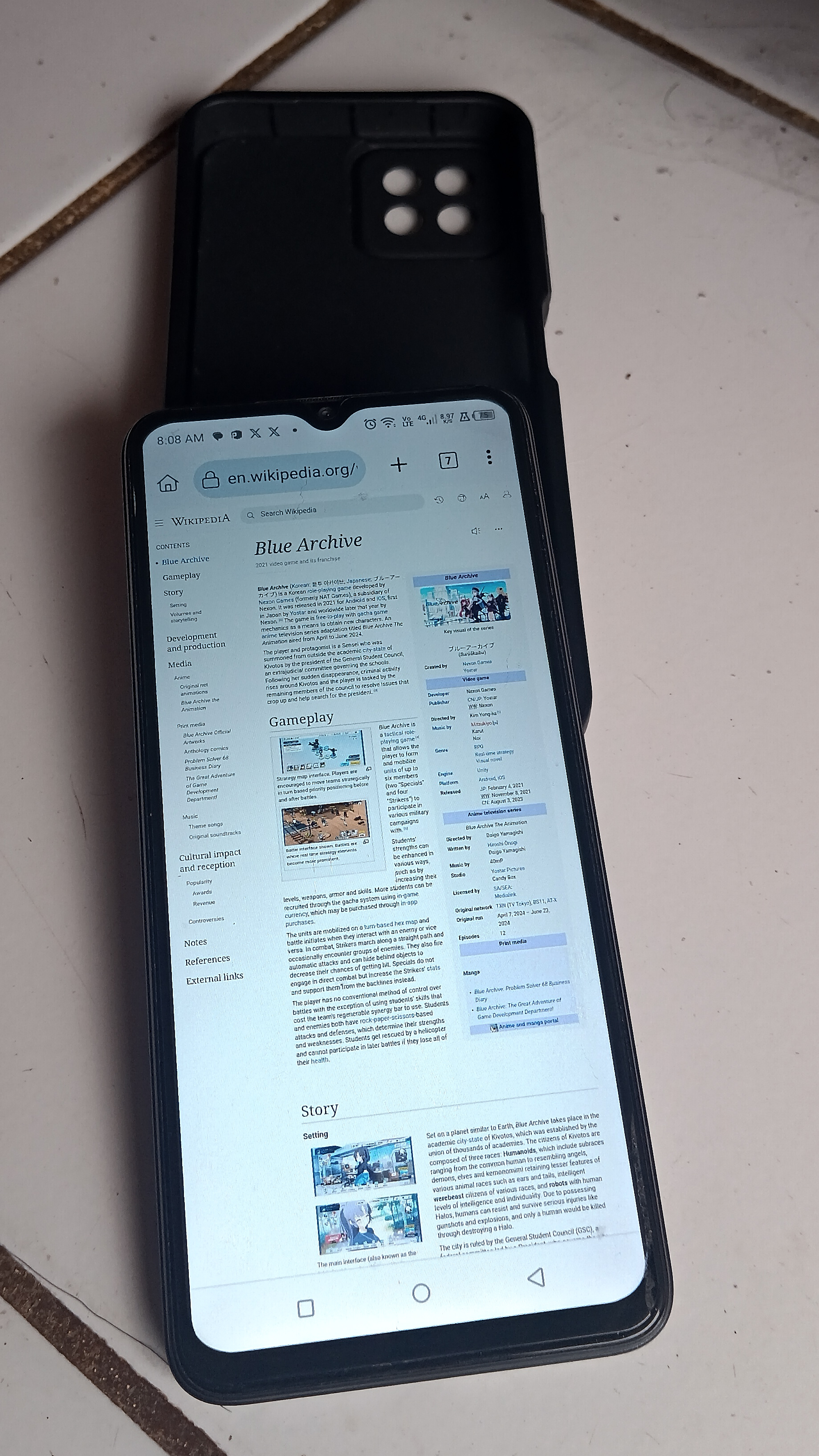
The front of Itel S23, one of the currently manufactured phones released by Itel. Note the bezel size and the "teardrop" camera notch.

Their products are mainly sold in various emerging markets, including parts of Africa, South Asia, Southeast Asia, Europe, India, Pakistan, Nigeria, Uganda, Bangladesh, Vietnam, Philippines, Saudi Arabia, Thailand, Indonesia and Latin America.

Since 19 April 2024, Itel has collaborated with CloudMosa to introduce a new 4G feature phone Super Guru 4G in India with various cloud-based widgets for feature phones using the Cloud Phone technology.

== itelOS ==
itelOS is a customized Android operating system developed by Chinese mobile phone manufacturer itel Mobile, a subsidiary of Transsion Holdings. The OS is used in the company’s smartphones. As itelOS 7.6 (based on Android 11), it was released with itel Vision 2s on September 7, 2021.

itelOS
- The logo of itelOS
- Developer: itel Mobile
- OS family: Android (Linux)
- Working state: Current
- Source model: Closed-source
- Initial release: September 7, 2021; 5 years ago
- Latest release: 16.3.0.150SP14 / September 11, 2026; 57 days ago
- Official website: www.itel-life.com

=== Version history ===
In September 2021, itelOS 7.6 was released and was based on Android 11. It shipped with a custom home screen app.

Version	Initial release	Android OS	Launch Version	Ref.
7.6	September 2021	11	First released with itel Vision 2s	
8.6	September 2022	12	First released with itel S18-Series	
13	September 2023	13	First released with itel S23+	
13.6	November 2023	13	Unveiled on itel P55T	
13.5	March 2024	13	Unveiled on itel S24 and RS4	
14	2024	14	First released with itel A50	
14.5	2024	14	First released with itel S25-Series	
15	2025	15	First released with itel Super 26 Ultra	
16	2026	16	First released with itel Power 80	

== See also ==
- Android, the operating system itelOS is based on
- XOS, Transsion's other Android skin similar to HiOS and itelOS
- List of custom Android distributions
- Android version history
