= Xiaomi Mi Pad 4 =

Tablet computer by Xiaomi

Xiaomi Mi Pad 4 Xiaomi Mi Pad 4 Plus
- Manufacturer: Xiaomi
- Type: Tablet computer
- Series: Mi Pad
- First released: Mi Pad 4: 25 June 2018; 8 years ago Mi Pad 4 Plus: 14 August 2018; 7 years ago
- Availability by region: China
- Predecessor: Xiaomi Mi Pad 3
- Successor: Xiaomi Pad 5
- Compatible networks: Mi Pad 4 LTE/Plus: 4G (LTE)
- Form factor: Slate
- Colors: Black, Rose Gold
- Dimensions: Mi Pad 4: 200.2 × 120.3 × 7.9 mm Mi Pad 4 Plus: 245.6 × 149.1 × 8 mm
- Weight: Mi Pad 4: 342.5 g Mi Pad 4 Plus: 485 g
- Operating system: Original: Android 8.1 Oreo + MIUI 9 Current: Android 8.1 Oreo + MIUI 10
- System-on-chip: Qualcomm SDM660 Snapdragon 660 (14 nm)
- CPU: Octa-core (4×2.2 GHz Kryo 260 Gold & 4×1.8 GHz Kryo 260 Silver)
- GPU: Adreno 512
- Memory: Mi Pad 4: 3/4 GB; Mi Pad 4 Plus: 4 GB; LPDDR4X
- Storage: Mi Pad 4: 32/64 GB; Mi Pad 4 Plus: 64/128 GB eMMC 5.1
- Removable storage: microSDXC up to 128 GB
- Battery: Non-removable, Li-Po; Mi Pad 4: 6000 mAh; Mi Pad 4 Plus: 8620 mAh
- Charging: 10 W
- Rear camera: 13 MP Omnivision OV13855, f/2.0, 27.69 mm, 1/3.06", 1.12 μm PDAF; HDR, panorama Video: 1080p@30fps, 720p@30fps
- Front camera: 5 MP Samsung S5K5E8, f/2.0, 2.64 mm, 85°, 1/5", 1.12 μm HDR; Video: 720p@30fps
- Display: IPS LCD, 1200 × 1920 (WUXGA), 16:10, 274 ppi Mi Pad 4: 8.0", 283 ppi Mi Pad 4 Plus: 10.1", 224 ppi
- Sound: 2 speakers
- Connectivity: USB-C 2.0, 3.5 mm audio jack, Bluetooth 5.0 (A2DP, LE), Wi-Fi 802.11 a/b/g/n/ac (dual-band, Wi-Fi Direct, hotspot); LTE models: GPS, A-GPS, GLONASS, BeiDou
- Codename: clover
- Other: Fingerprint scanner (front; Mi Pad 4 Plus), accelerometer, gyroscope, compass (LTE models)

The Xiaomi Mi Pad 4 and Xiaomi Mi Pad 4 Plus are tablet computers produced by Xiaomi. The Mi Pad 4 was introduced alongside the Redmi 6 Pro on June 25, 2018, and the Mi Pad 4 Plus followed on August 14 of the same year. The primary differences between the models are the display diagonal and the inclusion of a fingerprint scanner on the Mi Pad 4 Plus.

The Mi Pad 4 exists in both LTE and Wi-Fi-only versions, whereas the Mi Pad 4 Plus was sold exclusively with LTE support.

== Design ==
The display is made of glass and the frame is made of metal.

The screen features rounded corners and relatively thin side bezels. On the bottom bezel of the Mi Pad 4 Plus, an oval fingerprint scanner is located.

In a vertical orientation, the bottom houses the USB-C port, stereo speakers, and a microphone, while the 3.5 mm audio jack is located at the top. The left side contains the microSD slot (up to 256 GB) and the Nano-SIM slot for LTE models, while the right side features the volume rocker and power button.

The Mi Pad 4 and Mi Pad 4 Plus were sold in Black and Rose Gold colors.

== Specifications ==
=== Platform ===
Both tablets are powered by the Qualcomm Snapdragon 660 processor with an Adreno 512 GPU.

=== Battery ===
The Mi Pad 4 features a 6000 mAh battery, while the Mi Pad 4 Plus has a capacity of 8620 mAh.

=== Camera ===
The tablets feature a 13 MP Omnivision OV13855 main camera with an aperture of f/2.0, phase detection autofocus (PDAF), and 1080p@30fps video recording. The front camera is a 5 MP Samsung S5K5E8 with an aperture of f/2.0 and 720p@30fps video recording.

=== Display ===
The display is an IPS LCD, WUXGA (1200 × 1920) with a 16:10 aspect ratio. The Mi Pad 4 has an 8" diagonal and a pixel density of 283 ppi, while the Mi Pad 4 Plus has a 10.1" diagonal and 224 ppi.

=== Sound ===
The tablets are equipped with two speakers located on the bottom edge; however, due to this placement, a stereo effect is effectively absent in landscape mode.

=== Memory ===
The Xiaomi Mi Pad 4 was available in 3/32 GB and 4/64 GB configurations. The LTE version was sold exclusively in the 4/64 GB configuration.

The Xiaomi Mi Pad 4 Plus was available in 4/64 GB and 4/128 GB configurations.

=== Software ===
The tablets were released with MIUI 9 based on Android 8.1 Oreo and were later updated to MIUI 10.

== Reception ==
Marie Black from Tech Advisor give this a 4 out of 5 stars as "arguably one of the better compact Android tablets on the market". However, there are no preinstalled Google apps (including Google Play).

The Mi Pad 4 Plus received a 17-hour battery life tested from Andrzej Tokarski, reviewer from MyNextTablet. It also noticed excellent performance as an advantage. Games like Asphalt 9, Shadow of Death, Shadowgun Legends and Into The Dead 2 (with high graphics) also run normally.
