= Linux on Apple devices =

Linux kernel running on devices made by Apple

The Linux kernel can run on a variety of devices made by Apple, including devices where the unlocking of the bootloader is not possible with an official procedure, such as iPhones and iPads.

== iPad devices ==
In June 2022, software developers Konrad Dybcio and Markuss Broks managed to run Linux kernel 5.18 on a iPad Air 2. The project made use of the Alpine Linux based Linux distribution called Nura, which is primarily developed for Android devices. The developer suggested that they used the checkm8 exploit which was published back in 2019.

Hoolock Linux project maintains an experimental mainline Linux port for A7-A11 Apple devices.

== iPhone devices ==
In 2008, the 2.6 Linux kernel was ported to the iPhone 3G, the iPhone (1st generation), and the iPod Touch (1st generation) using OpeniBoot.

Corellium's Project Sandcastle made it possible to run Android on an iPhone 7/7+ or an iPod Touch (7th generation) using the checkm8 exploit.

Hoolock Linux project maintains an experimental mainline Linux port for A7-A11 and T2 Apple devices.

== iPod devices ==
iPodLinux is a Linux distribution created specifically to run on Apple's iPod.

There is an experimental port of the mainline Linux kernel to iPod Nano 5G by freemyipod/q3k.

Hoolock Linux project maintains an experimental mainline Linux port for A7-A11 Apple devices.

== Mac computers ==
=== Motorola 68k Macs ===
Linux can be dual-booted on Macs that use Motorola 680x0 processors (only 68020 and higher, and only non-"EC" processor variants since an MMU is required). The Linux/mac68k community project provides resources to do so, and an m68k community port of the Debian Linux distribution is also available.

=== PowerPC Macs ===
In 1996, Apple announced that they were supporting a Linux port to the PowerMacs.

PowerPC Macs can run Linux through both emulation and dual-booting ("bare metal"). The most popular PowerPC emulation tools for Mac OS/Mac OS X are Microsoft's Virtual PC, and the open-source QEMU.

Linux dual-booting is achieved by partitioning the boot drive, installing the Yaboot bootloader onto the Linux partition, and selecting that Linux partition as the Startup Disk. This results in users being prompted to select whether they want to boot into Mac OS or Linux when the machine starts.

By 2008, a number of major Linux distributions had official versions compatible with Mac PowerPC processors, including:

- Gentoo
- Debian (until Debian 8, revived shortly after as a Sid community port)
- Ubuntu (until Ubuntu 16.10)
- Fedora (until Fedora 17 for G3 and G4 processors, and Fedora 28 for G5)
- Yellow Dog Linux (discontinued in 2009)

All of the above PowerPC ports have since been discontinued, except for Gentoo and Debian (official support ended in Debian 8)

=== Intel Macs ===
Macs with Intel processors can run Linux natively through dual-booting or can run it through virtualization.

Intel Macs that predate the Apple T2 chip can run Linux natively, but may need specific installers or drivers. Macs with the T2 chip from 2018 can run Linux distributions natively using the T2Linux project.

Common virtualization tools for Intel Macs include VMware Fusion, Parallels Desktop, and VirtualBox.

In 2010, Whitson Gordon from Lifehacker noted that Apple has streamlined the process of dual booting Windows on Macs, but not for Linux. rEFIt made it possible to dual boot Linux.

=== Apple silicon Macs ===
Macs with Apple silicon processors can run Linux through the Asahi Linux command line installer for certain distributions including Fedora, Debian, and Ubuntu. While most features are available, some are unavailable on certain silicon processors and devices. They can also run it through virtualization.

== See also ==
- iBoot
- iOS jailbreaking
- MkLinux
- Linux for mobile devices
- Linux on IBM Z
- Linux range of use
- OtherOS
