= Irina Blok =

American graphic designer

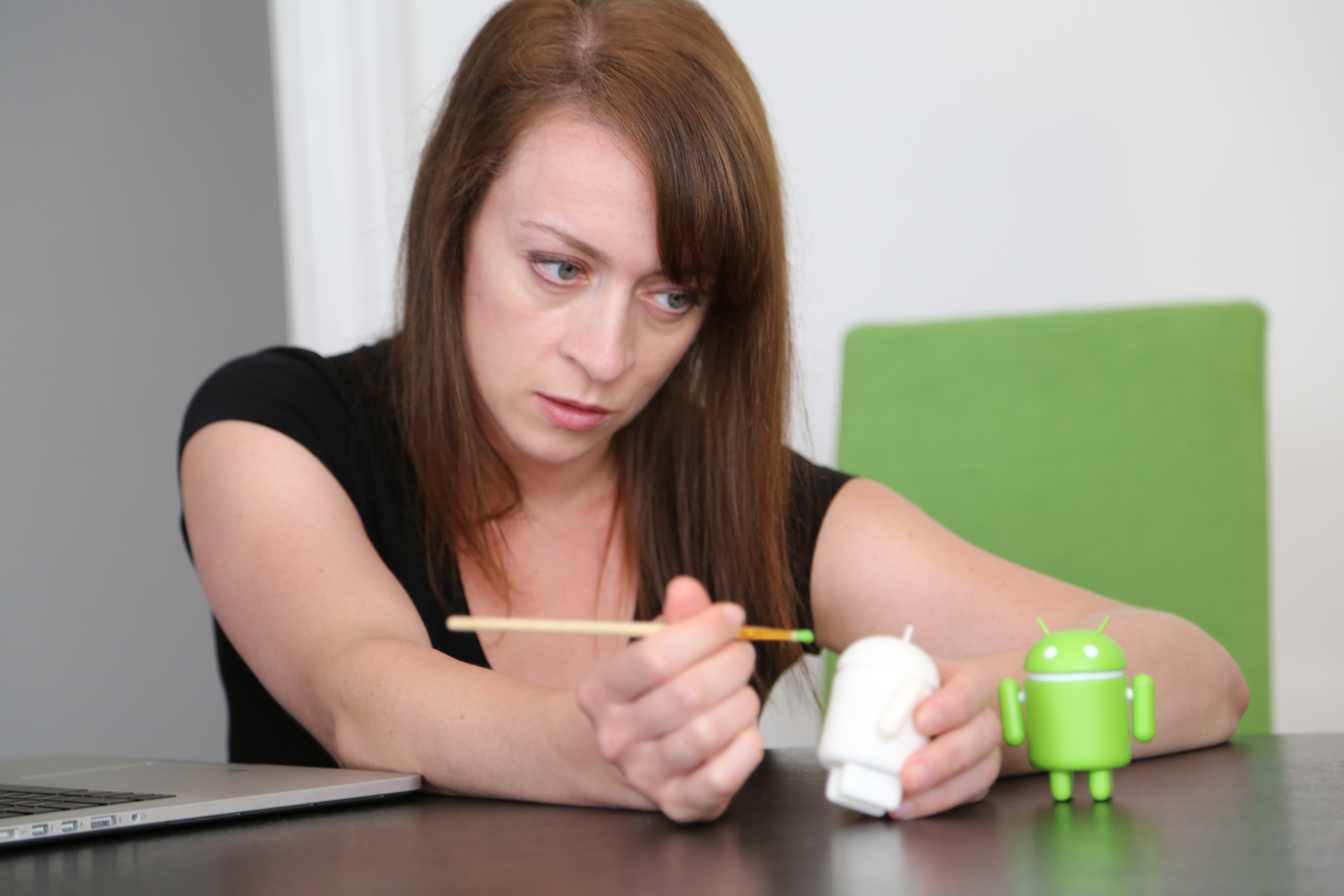
Blok in 2013

Irina Blok (born c. 1977) is a graphic designer and an artist. She is best known for the creation of the Android logo including its green robot icon.

== Life and career ==
She was born and raised in Saint Petersburg, Russia, until she and her parents moved to Silicon Valley, a region in Northern California, when she was 18 years old. She comes from a family of engineers, her parents and her grandparents were all engineers, making her their only graphic designer.

Irina Blok runs a small apparel design company called Creative Blok, her products are inspired by what takes place within our society at the time. She appeared on ABC's Reality Show Shark Tank as one of the contestants with her products and designs and was featured in NBC NY, USA today, SF weekly, the French Edition of Elle Magazine and multiple publications around the world.

Blok received her degree in Graphic Design at San Jose State University. She started her career at Landor Associates as brand designer, and helped create and evolve the brands of HP, Visa, H&R Block and FedEx. She continued her career at a number of tech companies including Yahoo, Google and Adobe. In the course of her career her design work has appeared in Communication Arts magazine, How magazine, AIGA CI Annual, and Creative Review. She is also a directed study advisor at the Graphic Design MFA Program at the Academy of Art University in San Francisco.
