= Xiaomi Pad 5 =

2021 Android-based tablet computers manufactured by Xiaomi

Xiaomi Pad 5 Xiaomi Pad 5 Pro Xiaomi Pad 5 Pro 5G Xiaomi Pad 5 Pro 12.4

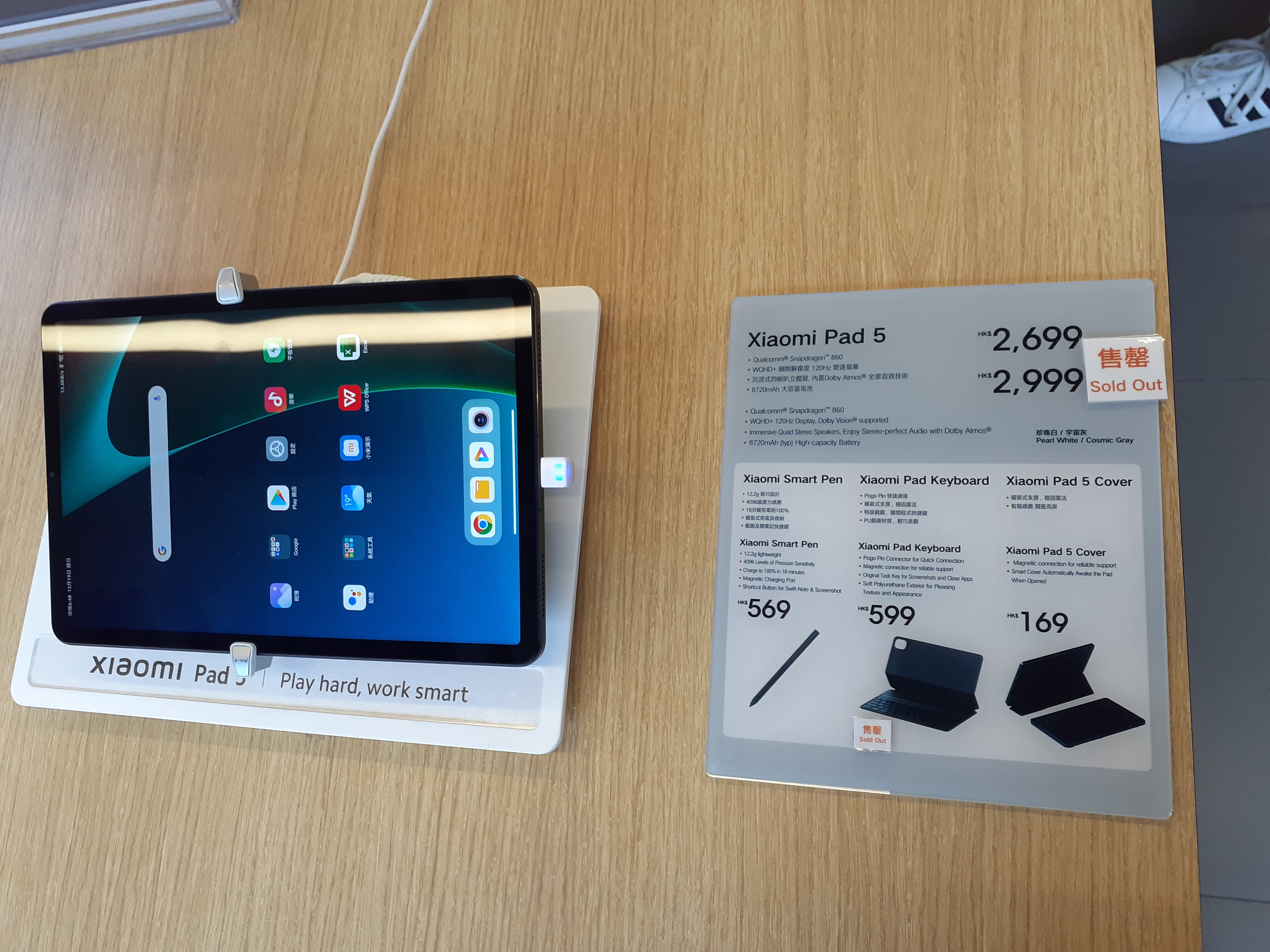
- Manufacturer: Xiaomi
- Type: Tablet computer
- Series: Pad
- First released: Pad 5/Pro/Pro 5G: August 10, 2021; 4 years ago Pad 5 Pro 12.4: August 11, 2022; 3 years ago
- Availability by region: Pad 5: China; India; Europe; United Kingdom; Pad 5 Pro: China only
- Predecessor: Xiaomi Mi Pad 4
- Successor: Xiaomi Pad 6
- Compatible networks: Pad 5/Pro/Pro 12.4: No cellular connectivity Pad 5 Pro 5G: GSM / CDMA / HSPA / EVDO / LTE / 5G
- Dimensions: Pad 5/Pro/Pro 5G: 254.69 mm (10.027 in) H 166.25 mm (6.545 in) W 6.86 mm (0.270 in) D Pad 5 Pro 12.4: 284.96 mm (11.219 in) H 185.23 mm (7.293 in) W 6.66 mm (0.262 in) D
- Weight: Pad 5: 511 g (18.0 oz); Pad 5 Pro: 515 g (18.2 oz); Pad 5 Pro 5G: 518 g (18.3 oz); Pad 5 Pro 12.4: 620 g (22 oz)
- Operating system: Pad 5/Pro/Pro 5G: Original: Android 11 with MIUI 12.5 for Pad; Current: Android 13 with Xiaomi HyperOS; Pad 5 Pro 12.4: Original: Android 12 with MIUI Pad 13.1; Current: Android 14 with Xiaomi HyperOS 2
- System-on-chip: Pad 5: Qualcomm Snapdragon 860 (7 nm); Pad 5 Pro/Pro 5G/Pro 12.4: Qualcomm Snapdragon 870 5G (7 nm)
- CPU: Pad 5: Octa-core (1x2.96 GHz Kryo 485 Gold & 3x2.42 GHz Kryo 485 Gold & 4x1.78 GHz Kryo 485 Silver); Pad 5 Pro/Pro 5G/Pro 12.4: Octa-core (1x3.2 GHz Kryo 585 & 3x2.42 GHz Kryo 585 & 4x1.80 GHz Kryo 585)
- GPU: Pad 5:Adreno 640; Pad 5 Pro/Pro 5G/Pro 12.4: Adreno 650
- Memory: Pad 5: 6 GB LPDDR4X RAM; Pad 5 Pro: 6/8 GB LPDDR5 RAM; Pad 5 Pro 5G: 8 GB LPDDR5 RAM; Pad 5 Pro 12.4: 6/8/12 GB LPDDR5 RAM
- Storage: Pad 5/Pro: 128 or 256 GB; Pad 5 Pro 5G: 256 GB; Pad 5 Pro 12.4: 128, 256 or 512 GB
- Removable storage: No
- SIM: Pad 5/Pro/Pro 12.4: no Pad 5 Pro 5G: nano-SIM
- Battery: Pad 5: Li-Po 8720 mAh; Pad 5 Pro/Pro 5G: Li-Po 8600 mAh; Pad 5 Pro 12.4: Li-Po 10000 mAh
- Charging: Pad 5: Fast charging 33W; Pad 5 Pro/Pro 5G/Pro 12.4: Fast charging 67W
- Rear camera: Pad 5: 13 MP, f/2.0 Pad 5 Pro: 13 MP, f/2.0, AF + 5 MP f/2.4 (depth); Pad 5 Pro 5G: 50 MP, f/1.8, 1/2.5", 0.7 μm, PDAF + 5 MP f/2.4 (depth); Pad 5 Pro 12.4: 50 MP, f/1.8, 1/2.5", 0.7 μm, PDAF + 2 MP f/2.4 (depth); All models: Dual-LED flash, HDR, panorama Pad 5/Pro/Pro 5G: 4K@30fps, 1080p@30fps Pad 5 Pro 12.4 : 4K@30fps, 1080p@30/60fps
- Front camera: Pad 5/Pro/Pro 5G: 8 MP, f/2.0 Pad 5 Pro 12.4: 20 MP Sony IMX596, f/2.24, 1/3.4", 1.6 μm 1080p@30/60fps
- Display: Pad 5/Pro/Pro 5G: 11.0 in (280 mm), ~274 ppi density Pad 5 Pro 12.4: 12.4 in (310 mm), ~244 ppi density All models: 1600 x 2560 px resolution, 16:10 ratio ( IPS LCD, 1B colors, 120Hz refresh rate, HDR10, Dolby Vision
- Sound: Stereo speakers Pad 5/Pro 12.4: two on both sides Pad 5 Pro/Pro 5G: four on both sides
- Connectivity: USB-C 2.0; Pad 5: Wi-Fi 802.11 a/b/g/n/ac, dual-band, Wi-Fi Direct, hotspot Pad 5 Pro/Pro 5G/Pro 12.4: Wi-Fi 802.11 a/b/g/n/ac/6, dual-band, Wi-Fi Direct, hotspot Pad 5: Bluetooth 5.0, A2DP, LE; Pad 5 Pro/Pro 5G/Pro 12.4: Bluetooth 5.2, A2DP, LE; Pad 5 Pro 5G: GPS, A-GPS, GLONASS, GALILEO, QZSS
- Data inputs: Multi-touch screen; Accelerometer; Gyroscope; Proximity sensor; Compass
- Model: Pad 5: 21051182C, 21051182G; Pad 5 Pro: M2105K81AC; Pad 5 Pro 5G: M2105K81C; Pad 5 Pro 12.4: 22081281AC
- Codename: Pad 5: nabu Pad 5 Pro: elish Pad 5 Pro 5G: enuma Pad 5 Pro 12.4: dagu
- Website: www.mi.com/global/product/xiaomi-pad-5/

The Xiaomi Pad 5 and Xiaomi Pad 5 Pro are tablet computers developed by Xiaomi. The Xiaomi Pad 5 Pro comes in three variations: the Xiaomi Pad 5 Pro without cellular network support, the Xiaomi Pad 5 Pro 5G with cellular network support, GPS, and a different main camera module, and the Xiaomi Pad 5 Pro 12.4 featuring a larger screen and other specification differences.

The Xiaomi Pad 5, Pad 5 Pro, and Pad 5 Pro 5G were introduced in China on August 10, 2021, alongside the Xiaomi MIX 4, while the Xiaomi Pad 5 Pro 12.4 was announced on August 11, 2022, alongside the Xiaomi MIX Fold 2 and Redmi K50 Ultra. These tablets succeed the Xiaomi Mi Pad 4 and Mi Pad 4 Plus.

For the global market, the Xiaomi Pad 5 was unveiled on September 15, 2021, alongside the Xiaomi 11T series and the Xiaomi 11 Lite 5G NE. 7 months later, the Pad 5 was released in India on April 27, 2022. It became the first Xiaomi tablet since the original Mi Pad to be officially sold outside of China.
