= Orientation sensing =

An orientation sensor can be found in some digital cameras. By recording the orientation at the time of capture, the camera's software can determine whether the image should be oriented to landscape or portrait format.

In robotics, an orientation sensor can be used in realigning an end effector, enabling the robot to adjust its position and approach accordingly.
