= Project Iris =

Unreleased AR headset developed by Google

Project Iris is an unreleased augmented reality (AR) headset designed and developed by Google. It was intended to resemble ordinary eyeglasses and expected to be released in 2024, until its cancellation in early 2023.

Following the highly publicized failure of Google Glass smartglasses in 2013, Google executives were initially disinclined to re-enter the field of wearable AR technology. However, work had begun on a new AR headset by 2021 under the leadership of Clay Bavor, codenamed Project Iris. The project underwent a turbulent development stage, with Google executives constantly shifting their vision for Iris. To facilitate its efforts, the company also acquired North and Raxium.

After going through numerous iterations, a version of Iris was unveiled at the 2022 Google I/O keynote before undergoing public testing later that year. In June 2023, after Apple unveiled the Vision Pro mixed reality headset before Iris could be released, Google abandoned the project in the midst of company-wide layoffs and internal turmoil, announcing the Android XR extended reality operating system in December 2024 as Project Iris' spiritual successor.

== History ==
=== Background ===
Google first experimented with the prospect of smartglasses with the introduction of Google Glass in 2013. The product was panned by critics due to privacy and ethical concerns, leading Google to discontinue the consumer-facing model and focus on the enterprise model. In May 2019, Google VR/AR head Clay Bavor told CNET that the company was heavily invested in R&D regarding AR devices, while a February 2020 report from The Information revealed that Google had no plans to develop a new pair of augmented reality (AR) smartglasses as of mid-2019, in part due to the highly publicized failure of Glass. In June 2020, Google acquired North, a manufacturer of smartglasses, to assist in its hardware division's vision of ambient computing. Shortly after the acquisition, the company began work on a new pair of AR smartglasses based on North designs, which The New York Times confirmed in December 2021.

In August 2021, following the announcement that the Pixel 6 and Pixel 6 Pro smartphones would feature the custom-developed Tensor system-on-chip (SoC), Google hardware chief Rick Osterloh told Business Insider that he believed that Tensor had long-term potential for AR-powered smartglasses, and was echoed by CEO Sundar Pichai in October. In November, a "Google Labs" division led by Bavor was created to oversee Google's AR and virtual reality (VR) ventures, unrelated to the defunct service of the same name, while development on an AR operating system began the next month for an unknown "innovative AR device", an effort spearheaded by Mark Lucovsky. Meanwhile, Google began work on two custom system-on-chips akin to Tensor, codenamed Alius and Alexandrite, which would power its smartglasses.

=== Development ===
In January 2022, The Verge reported that Google was building an AR headset that used "outward-facing cameras to blend computer graphics with a video feed of the real world", internally codenamed Project Iris and being developed in a highly secretive and secure facility located in the San Francisco Bay Area. Overseen by Bavor, the headset was to be powered by the Android operating system as well as a custom system-on-chip, expected to launch in 2024 alongside the experimental Project Starline. Other key people named as part of the project include Shahram Izadi, Eddie Chung, Scott Huffman, Kurt Akeley, Paul Greco, and Lucovsky. Over the next two years, Google executives constantly changed strategies regarding Project Iris, frustrating employees.

During this time, Google rival Apple was concurrently developing its own mixed reality (MR) headset, eventually announced as the Vision Pro. When reports began to surface in early 2022 that Apple was making significant progress on the Vision Pro and nearing an official launch, Google executives panicked and formed a partnership with Android collaborator Samsung, who also wished to build an MR headset. As part of "Project Moohan", Google agreed to provide Samsung with the software for a headset designed by Samsung. Moohan resembled ski goggles and had a targeted release date of 2024. Tensions soon arose between the two companies, with Samsung consolidating its control over the project to prevent Google from building a rival product.

In March 2022, The Information reported that Google would acquire Raxium, an AR hardware startup, for approximately $1 billion, and would continue to make further acquisitions to assist in their AR and MR work. The acquisition was completed a month later. During the 2022 Google I/O keynote in May, Google unveiled a version of Iris resembling eyeglasses with live translation capabilities. The company began publicly testing these prototypes across the U.S. in August, before expanding into Canada in October. In December 2022, 9to5Google reported that the company was considering using rings or bracelets to control Iris. Google discontinued Glass Enterprise in March 2023.

=== Cancellation ===
In June 2023, Apple unveiled the Vision Pro, frustrating many Google employees. Three weeks later, Business Insider reported that Google had shelved Project Iris as part of its company-wide cost-cutting measures earlier in the year, which saw mass layoffs and the departure of Bavor. The final product would have resembled ordinary eyeglasses. The Verge observed that Akeley was now listed as retired on LinkedIn, while Lucovsky, many North employees, and several other engineers remained involved in Google's AR ventures; Chung had departed the company in February. Lucovsky left the following month, and Izadi assumed leadership of the AR division, now focused mainly on Project Moohan and reporting to Google senior vice president Hiroshi Lockheimer. Employees did not rule out the possibility of Iris being resurrected in the future. 9to5Google unearthed evidence in November that pointed to a possible revival of the project, locating a new string of code on the Google app on Android referencing Iris and the ability to activate the Google Assistant virtual assistant by touching one's right temple. Google laid off much of its AR hardware team in January 2024.

Meanwhile, Google shifted its focus from hardware to AR and MR software, which they hoped to license to third-party manufacturers à la Android. A new team under Izadi began incorporating Iris' code into a new project codenamed Betty, intended to be part of a "Micro XR" platform that would be pitched to manufacturers. The former Raxium team continued to explore potential AR hardware projects under Greco's supervision, but was reportedly "firewalled" from the Moohan and Betty crews. A Google employee described the situation as "a weird bureaucratic mess". The Information reported in December 2023 that Google was also looking to integrate a new virtual assistant codenamed "Pixie", powered by its recently announced Gemini large language model, into glasses. Google announced Android XR, a new operating system that would launch on Samsung's Moohan headset, in December 2024.

== Critical commentary ==
Writing for 9to5Google, Abner Li opined in February 2021 that Google should begin work on AR glasses technology as soon as possible to counter similar efforts from Apple if it wished not to be left behind in the future. Following The Verge's report on Project Iris, Nicholas Sutrich of Android Central and analyst Anshel Sag of Moor Insights & Strategy agreed that it would be a daunting task for Google to reinstill the public's trust in its commitment to supporting its products in the long term, as well as demonstrate its investment in extended reality (XR), citing the failure of the Stadia cloud gaming service as a cautionary tale. Tom Pritchard of Tom's Guide believed that Google's acquisition of Raxium technologies gave it an edge over other potential competitors.

On the AR translation glasses Google demoed at I/O in 2022, The Verge's Antonio G. Di Benedetto and Mitchell Clark felt that Google's apparent goal to break down the language barrier was ambitious and difficult to accomplish, while their colleague Sean Hollister wrote that Google would have to develop AR experiences "more compelling or convenient than what phones already offer". After news broke that the project had been scrapped, Li expressed concern for Google's hardware division, deeming the cancellation a missed opportunity, while Charlie Sorrel of Lifewire speculated that Google may have been intimidated by the Vision Pro. Lorne Fade, the co-founder of the VR Vision training company, reasoned that Google would likely "follow Apple and come out with an XR device in the coming years".

== See also ==
- Meta Quest Pro
- Microsoft HoloLens 2
