= Android XR =

Extended reality operating system

- Developer: Google; Samsung Electronics
- OS family: Android
- Working state: Active
- Initial release: October 20, 2025; 11 months ago
- Official website: www.android.com/xr/

Android XR is an extended reality (XR) operating system developed by Google and Samsung Electronics. It is based on Android. It was announced in December 12, 2024 and launched in October 20, 2025. The operating system is designed to support XR devices, including Samsung Galaxy XR and a pair of smartglasses developed by Google DeepMind. Android XR is heavily integrated with the Gemini generative artificial intelligence–powered chatbot.

Following Google's earlier commercial failure of Google Glass, an earlier head-worn product, Google acquired VR companies Tilt Brush and Owlchemy Labs and made other ventures into head-worn computing products including the Google Cardboard and Google Daydream VR headsets, which were both eventually discontinued. In 2021, Google revived its XR efforts with a project internally codenamed Project Iris, an AR headset powered by a new operating system. However, Google shelved the project after Apple released the Vision Pro VR headset in 2024. One year later, Google announced Android XR as Project Iris' spiritual successor.

== History ==
=== Background ===
Google first experimented with the prospect of smartglasses with the introduction of Google Glass in 2013. The product was panned by critics due to privacy and ethical concerns, leading Google to discontinue the consumer-facing model and focus on the enterprise model. In May 2019, Google VR/AR head Clay Bavor told CNET that the company was heavily invested in R&D regarding AR devices, while a February 2020 report from The Information revealed that Google had no plans to develop a new pair of augmented reality (AR) smartglasses as of mid-2019, in part due to the highly publicized failure of Glass. In June 2020, Google acquired North, a manufacturer of smartglasses, to assist in its hardware division's vision of ambient computing. Shortly after the acquisition, the company began work on a new pair of AR smartglasses based on North designs, which The New York Times confirmed in December 2021.

In August 2021, following the announcement that the Pixel 6 and Pixel 6 Pro smartphones would feature the custom-developed Tensor system-on-chip (SoC), Google hardware chief Rick Osterloh told Business Insider that he believed that Tensor had long-term potential for AR-powered smartglasses, and was echoed by CEO Sundar Pichai in October. In November, a "Google Labs" division led by Bavor was created to oversee Google's AR and virtual reality (VR) ventures, unrelated to the defunct service of the same name, while development on an AR operating system began the next month for an unknown "innovative AR device", an effort spearheaded by Mark Lucovsky. Meanwhile, Google began work on two custom system-on-chips akin to Tensor, codenamed Alius and Alexandrite, which would power its smartglasses.

=== Development ===
In January 2022, The Verge reported that Google was building an AR headset as part of an effort internally codenamed Project Iris and overseen by Bavor. This coincided with Google rival Apple's own initiative to develop a mixed reality (MR) headset. After Apple outmaneuvered Google by unveiling its headset, the Vision Pro, in June 2023, which frustrated employees, Business Insider reported that Project Iris had been canceled as part of Google's company-wide cost-cutting measures earlier in the year, which saw mass layoffs and the departure of Bavor.

Earlier in 2022, Google executives had grown alarmed by reports on Apple's progress on the Vision Pro, which surpassed their own. The company struck a partnership with Android collaborator Samsung, in which they would develop the software for an MR headset manufactured by Samsung, codenamed Project Moohan. Tensions soon arose between the two companies, with Samsung consolidating its control over the project to prevent Google from building a rival product. "Moohan" is a reference to the Korean word for infinity. Google also acquired Raxium, an AR hardware startup, for approximately $1 billion in March 2022, which was completed a month later.

After Iris' cancellation, Google shifted its focus from hardware to software, which they hoped to license to third-party Android manufacturers. Lucovsky left the company and Shahram Izadi assumed leadership of Google's AR division, reporting to Google senior vice president Hiroshi Lockheimer. A new team under Izadi began incorporating Iris' code into a new project codenamed Betty, intended to be part of a "Micro XR" platform that would be pitched to manufacturers. The former Raxium team continued to explore potential AR hardware projects under Greco's supervision, but was reportedly "firewalled" from the Moohan and Betty crews. A Google employee described the situation as "a weird bureaucratic mess".

Meanwhile, at the annual Google I/O keynote in May 2024, Google demonstrated a pair of prototype smartglasses powered by Project Astra, a multimodal "AI assistant" from Google DeepMind that uses the Gemini Ultra large language model. These smartglasses were visually distinct from the Project Iris prototype demonstrated at I/O two years prior, indicating they were separate projects. In a rare public appearance, Google co-founder Sergey Brin called the glasses "the perfect hardware" for artificial intelligence (AI), acknowledging that Glass had been ahead of its time: "Unfortunately, we sort of messed up on the timing. I sort of wish I timed it a bit better." Following the event, Business Insider reported that Google's XR platform would be named Android XR, was targeting an early 2025 launch, and would leverage Raxium's optical technology.

=== Launch ===
Google announced the Android XR operating system on December 12, 2024, in New York City, with plans to launch it on Samsung's Moohan headset the following year. Viewed as the successor to Glass, Cardboard, and Daydream, the operating system was developed in collaboration with Samsung and Qualcomm and is heavily integrated with Gemini, Google's generative AI–powered chatbot. In addition to Moohan, Google unveiled the Project Astra smartglasses it had previously demoed, also powered by Android XR and aiming for a 2025 release, though no definite timeline was set for the latter. The glasses employ Raxium's microLED technology, allowing for "bright images without using a lot of power".

Contrasting Android XR with the Vision Pro, Izadi and Android chief Sameer Samat emphasized the open-platform nature of Google's approach, as opposed to Apple's walled garden strategy. Victoria Song of The Verge compared the experience of wearing these glasses to J.A.R.V.I.S., a fictional AI in the Marvel Cinematic Universe, and Ryan Christoffel of 9to5Mac and Mark Gurman of Bloomberg News noted Moohan's visual resemblance to the Vision Pro. Several journalists who attended the announcement reflected on Google's decade-long journey from Glass to the present day.

== See also ==
- visionOS
- Meta Horizon OS
  - version history
- Windows Mixed Reality
- SteamOS
