= Tecno Phantom X2 =

Android-based Chinese smartphones

Tecno Phantom X2 Tecno Phantom X2 Pro
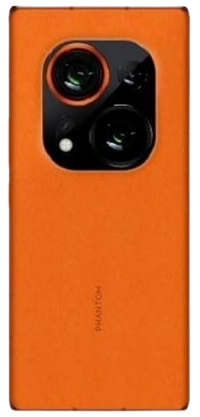
- Back of Tecno Phantom X2 Pro
- Brand: Tecno Phantom
- Manufacturer: Tecno Mobile
- Type: Phablet
- Series: Phantom X2
- First released: 20 January 2023; 3 years ago
- Predecessor: Tecno Phantom X
- Related: Tecno Phantom V Flip; Tecno Phantom V Fold
- Compatible networks: 2G, 3G, 4G, 5G
- Form factor: Slate
- Dimensions: Phantom X2: 164.6 mm (6.48 in) H 72.7 mm (2.86 in) W 8.9 mm (0.35 in) D; Phantom X2 Pro: 164.6 mm (6.48 in) H 72.7 mm (2.86 in) W 9 mm (0.35 in) D
- Weight: Phantom X2: 203 g (7.2 oz); Phantom X2 Pro: 201 g (7.1 oz)
- Operating system: Android 13 with HiOS V13.5.0
- System-on-chip: MediaTek Dimensity 9000
- CPU: Octa-core, (1×3.05 GHz Cortex-X2 & 3×2.85 GHz Cortex-A710 & 4×1.80 GHz Cortex-A510)
- GPU: Mali-G710 MC10
- Memory: Phantom X2: 4/8 GB RAM; Phantom X2 Pro: 4/12 GB RAM
- Storage: UFS 3.1; 64/128/256 GB
- Removable storage: None
- Battery: 5160 mAh
- Charging: 45W wired
- Rear camera: Phantom X2: 64 MP, f/1.7, (wide), 1/1.7", 0.8 μm, PDAF, OIS 13 MP, f/2.2, (ultrawide), 1/1.3", 1.12 μm, AF 2MP; Phantom X2 Pro: 50 MP, f/1.9, (wide), 1/1.3", 1.2 μm, PDAF 50 MP, f/1.5, 65 mm (telephoto), 1/2.7", 0.64 μm, PDAF, 2.5x optical zoom, retractable lens 13 MP, f/2.2, (ultrawide), 1/1.3", 1.12 μm, AF
- Front camera: Phantom X2 and Phantom X2 Pro: 32 MP, f/2.5 (wide), 1/2.8", 0.8 μm
- Display: AMOLED capacitive touchscreen, 1080 × 2400, 6.8 in (170 mm), 20:9 aspect ratio, (387 ppi), 120 Hz refresh rate, Corning Gorilla Glass Victus, ~93.3% screen-to-body ratio, 500 nits
- Sound: Loudspeaker
- Connectivity: Bluetooth 5.3; Wi-Fi 802.11 a/b/g/n/ac, dual-band
- Data inputs: Sensors: Accelerometer; Fingerprint scanner (under display, optical); Gyroscope; Proximity sensor; Intelligent digital assistant; Face ID; Other: USB-C; USB On-The-Go; 3.5mm Headphone jack
- Model: AD8 (Phantom X2); AD9 (Phantom X2 Pro)
- Website: Official

Tecno Phantom X2 and Tecno Phantom X2 Pro are Android-based smartphones manufactured, released and marketed by Tecno Mobile as part of the Phantom sub-brand. The devices were unveiled during an event held on 20 January 2023 as successors to Tecno Phantom X.

The Phantom X2 and Phantom X2 Pro is an upgraded version of Phantom X, coming with different features, including the OS, camera, design and battery. The phone has received generally favorable reviews, with critics mostly noting the performance, bigger battery and fast charging capacity.

== Design ==
The Phantom X2 and Phantom X2 Pro come with the same design. The phones are fitted with a glass back and a front glass that is covered by Gorilla Glass Victus and an aluminum frame. Both devices come with a camera module that is placed centrally on the rear cover. The display of both phones features a punch hole placed centrally for the front camera.

Colours of the devices
Phantom X2		Phantom X2 Pro	
Color	Name	Color	Name
	Stardust Gray		Stardust Gray
	Moonlight Silver		Mars Orange

== Specifications ==
=== Hardware ===
==== Chipsets ====
Both devices utilize the MediaTek Dimensity 9000 system-on-chip.

==== Display ====
Both devices feature an AMOLED display with 1080p support and a display size of 6.8-inches. They utilize an optical in-screen fingerprint sensor. The devices have a curved-edge display with an OLED panel and support a 120 Hz refresh rate. They feature a 1080 × 2400 resolution with a 20:9 aspect ratio.

==== Storage ====
The Phantom X2 offers 4/8 GB of RAM, while the Phantom X2 Pro offers 4/12 GB of RAM. Both devices come with 64/128/256 GB of internal storage and lack a microSD card slot.

==== Battery ====
The devices contain a non-removable 5160 mAh Li-Po battery, supporting wired charging over USB-C at up to 45W.

==== Connectivity ====
The phones support 5G network, Wi-Fi 802.11 and Bluetooth 5.3.

==== Cameras ====
Camera specs on both devices
Models	Phantom X2	Phantom X2 Pro
Wide	64 MP, f/1.7, 1/1.7", 0.8 μm, PDAF, OIS	50 MP, f/1.9, 1/1.3", 1.2 μm, PDAF
Ultrawide	13 MP, f/2.2, 1/1.3", 1.12 μm, AF	13 MP, f/2.2, 1/1.3", 1.12 μm, AF
Telephoto	–	50 MP, f/1.5, 65 mm, 1/2.7", 0.64 μm, PDAF
Depth	2 MP	–
Front	32 MP, f/2.5, 1/2.8", 0.8 μm	

The Phantom X2 has a 64 MP wide sensor, a 13 MP ultrawide sensor and a 2 MP depth sensor, while the Phantom X2 Pro has a 50 MP wide sensor, a 13 MP ultrawide sensor and a 50 MP telephoto sensor with 2.5x optical zoom and a retractable lens. The front-facing camera of both devices uses a 32 MP sensor.

===== Supported video modes =====
The Tecno Phantom X2 series supports the following video modes:

- 4K@30/60fps
- 1080p@30/60fps

=== Software ===
Both devices run on Android 12 based software overlay HiOS 12 at launch, and come bundled with a slew of apps like IDA Engine 3.0, Aurora Engine, Ella 2.0 and Welife among others.

== Reception ==
Harish Jonnalagadda from Android Central awarded the Phantom X2 Pro 3.2 stars out of 5, noting that the device "gets a lot right on the hardware side of things". Praise was directed towards the design, operating system, back camera with retractable portrait lens and battery. However, the software lack of refinement was criticized, while noting that "the phone will not get platform updates on time".

Adam Z. Lein from Pocketnow praised the Phantom X2 Pro for its camera, while noting that the device is "a nice entry into the competition as TECNO's flagship".

My Mobile India awarded the Phantom X2 4.5 stars out of 5, noting that the device "is a worthy example with which the company hopes to branch out into flagship territory".

Tech Arena24 praised the Phantom X2 Pro for its camera sensors and Gorilla Glass Victus protection. However, the lack of IP68 water and dust resistance rating, OIS stabilization, wireless charging, HDR10+, Dolby Vision, a brighter screen and up to three years of software update plan were criticized.

Oscar Frank praised the Phantom X2 Pro for its design, camera and processor while noting that the device is a "super smartphone from Tecno, if not the best they have to date". He however criticized the device for its speaker and microphone.
