= Moto G (2025) =

Android smartphones by Motorola

- Manufacturer: Motorola Mobility
- Type: Smartphone
- Series: Moto G Family
- First released: January 30, 2025; 20 months ago
- Successor: Moto G (2026)
- Form factor: Slate
- Operating system: Android 15
- Memory: 4GB
- Storage: 128GB
- Battery: 5,000mAh
- Rear camera: 50MP, 2MP
- Front camera: 16MP
- Display: 120Hz
- Connectivity: 2G, 3G, 4G LTE and 5G

The Moto G (2025) is a series of Android smartphones developed by Motorola Mobility. The lineup comprises two models released sequentially: Moto G (2025) and Moto G Power (2025).

== Overview ==
The hardware configuration is split across the series. The entry-level and mid-range variants (Standard and Power) utilise the MediaTek Dimensity 6300 chipset paired with a display of 120 Hz refresh rate.

The primary camera has a capacity of 50 Megapixel supporting HD recording at 30fps. It was available with 4GB of RAM and 128GB of storage with microSD card slot for storage expansion.

All devices in the 2025 generation ship with Android 15. Motorola stated a support lifecycle of two major OS upgrades and three years of security patches.

== Release timeline ==
The rollout began in January 2025. The Moto G was released in the United States on January, 2025. The Moto G Power launched on February 6, 2025.

== Product review ==
Philip Michaels for Tom's Guide reviewed the product and felt that the display is dim. He wrote "Basically, the Moto G (2025) runs about as well as you can expect a phone in this price range to run, for good or for ill. If the phone didn't exceed expectations in this particular category, at least it didn't fall below them, either." Sarah Lord of PCMag rated the phone as average and opined "While the Motorola Moto G remains affordable, the Samsung Galaxy A15 is better in nearly every way despite its age." Nicholas Sutrich of Android Central stated "The Samsung Galaxy A15 5G stays in the $200 range and offers a vibrant AMOLED screen, but it's not suitable for folks sensitive to PWM dimming. It's also got a lower refresh rate than the Moto G 2025's screen, has a slower processor, and the cameras aren't as good as Motorola's, but Samsung will update this phone until Android 18 is available, plus extra security updates on top of that." Mike Sorrentino of CNET loved the "the 16-megapixel selfie camera" but felt "daylight photos hit or miss in quality", writing "if you do need a more basic Android phone and you are able to get it for a lower price, it will be able to run most essential tasks, apps and take simple photos." Julian Chokkattu of Wired loved the camera and wrote "The main camera is a 50-megapixel sensor and it's joined by an 8-MP ultrawide that also doubles as a macro camera. The primary shooter is decent."

== See also ==
- Moto G
- Motorola Mobility
- Android 15
