= Samsung Galaxy XR =

2025 mixed reality headset by Samsung Electronics

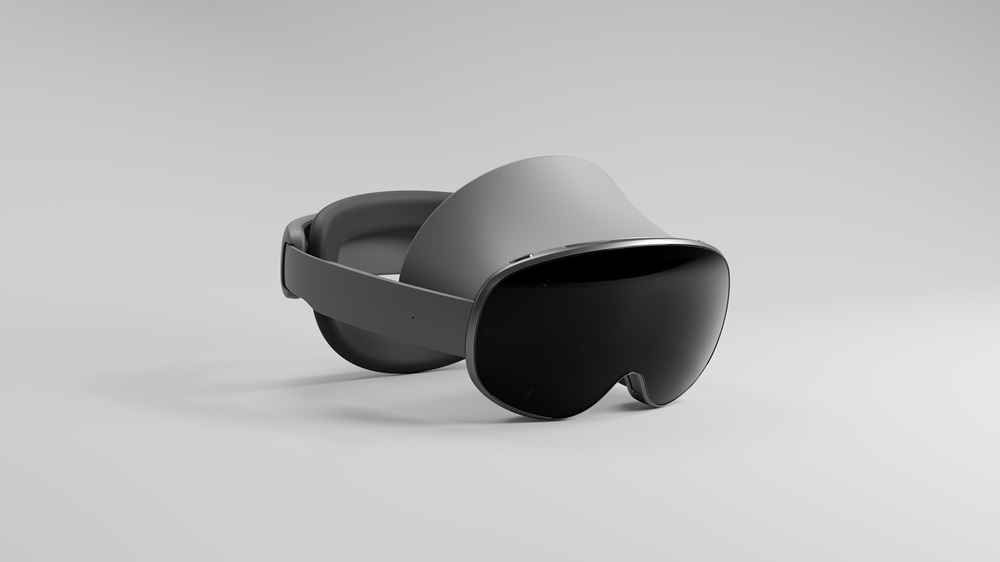
- Render of the Samsung Galaxy XR headset
- Brand: Samsung
- Manufacturer: Samsung Electronics
- Type: Standalone mixed reality headset
- Family: Samsung Galaxy
- First released: October 21, 2025; 8 months ago
- Availability by region: October 31, 2025; 7 months ago
- Predecessor: Samsung Gear VR
- Weight: 545 g (19 oz) + 302 g battery pack
- Operating system: Android XR
- System-on-chip: Qualcomm Snapdragon XR2+ Gen 2
- Memory: 16 GB
- Storage: 256 GB
- Battery: 302g external battery pack
- Rear camera: Two 6.5 MP passthrough cameras, six outer tracking cameras, four inner eye-tracking cameras
- Display: 2x 3552 x 3840 Micro-OLED displays (27 megapixels total), up to 90 Hz
- Sound: Two 2-way speakers, six-microphone array
- Connectivity: Wi-Fi 7 (802.11be), Bluetooth 5.4
- Data inputs: 6DoF inside-out tracking, hand tracking, eye tracking, voice commands
- Codename: Project Moohan
- Other: Controllers: Galaxy XR Controllers (sold separately); Price: US$1,799

The Samsung Galaxy XR (XR short for extended reality) is a mixed reality headset manufactured, developed, designed and marketed by Samsung Electronics in partnership with Google and Qualcomm. Previously known by its codename "Project Moohan" (Korean: 무한, lit. 'infinity'), the device was officially unveiled on October 21, 2025, priced at US$1,799. The headset is the first device to run Android XR, a variant of the Android operating system designed for mixed reality applications.

The Galaxy XR became available for pre-order on October 21, 2025, in the United States and South Korea, with shipments beginning on October 31, 2025.

== History ==
=== Background and development ===
Google first announced the Android XR platform and the headset in December 2024, identifying Samsung's "Project Moohan" as the platform's launch device. The collaboration between Samsung, Google, and Qualcomm was formed to develop a mixed reality ecosystem as an alternative to closed platforms.

The device was shown 2 times in the January 2025 Galaxy Unpacked event and the July 2025 Galaxy Unpacked event. Early prototypes of the headset were demonstrated at Google I/O in May 2025 before the device's official launch. The partnership assigned specific roles: Samsung designed the hardware, Google (which led the Open Handset Alliance) developed the Android XR operating system, and Qualcomm produced a specialized processor for the device.

=== Launch ===
Samsung officially unveiled the Galaxy XR at a special event on October 21, 2025, confirming the device's specifications and pricing. Pre-orders opened immediately in the United States and South Korea, with the first units shipped on October 31, 2025.

== Technical specifications ==
=== Hardware design ===
The headset has a total weight of 847 grams, consisting of a 545-gram head-mounted unit and a separate 302-gram external battery pack connected via cable. The design includes a forehead cushion and a rear adjustment dial for weight distribution.

The Galaxy XR features dual micro-OLED displays with a resolution of 3552 x 3840 pixels per eye, totaling 27 megapixels combined. The displays support refresh rates of 60 Hz, 72 Hz, and 90 Hz, with 72 Hz set as the default. The field of view measures 109 degrees horizontally and 100 degrees vertically, with interpupillary distance adjustment ranging from 54 to 70 millimeters.

=== Processing and sensors ===
The device is powered by the Qualcomm Snapdragon XR2+ Gen 2 system-on-chip with 16 GB of RAM and 256 GB of internal storage. The sensor array includes two 6.5-megapixel front-facing cameras for passthrough video and 3D content capture, six world-facing cameras for inside-out positional tracking, four internal cameras for eye tracking, one depth sensor, five inertial measurement units, and one flicker sensor.

Audio is provided by integrated two-way speakers featuring separate woofers and tweeters for each ear, along with a six-microphone array. Network connectivity is supported through Wi-Fi 7 (802.11be) and Bluetooth 5.4.

=== Battery and controllers ===
The external battery pack provides approximately two hours of general use or 2.5 hours of video playback. Optional motion controllers, marketed as Galaxy XR Controllers, are available as a separate purchase for $249.

=== Software ===
The Galaxy XR runs Android XR, an operating system designed for spatial computing and mixed reality applications. According to Google, a primary feature of the platform is compatibility with existing two-dimensional Android applications from the Google Play Store, which can be displayed in multiple resizable windows arranged in physical space.

The software integrates Google's Gemini artificial intelligence assistant, which is designed to provide contextually aware responses based on the user's environment and on-screen content. Primary input methods include hand tracking, eye tracking, and voice commands.

For software development, Android XR supports industry standards including OpenXR and WebXR, as well as the Unity game engine. Google released a Jetpack XR software development kit for creating spatial applications. Third-party applications announced for the platform include an MLB application featuring three-dimensional player visualization and Adobe's Project Pulsar video editor.

== Reception ==
Early hands-on impressions of the Samsung Galaxy XR were generally favorable regarding hardware quality, though reviewers noted that software execution would be critical to the product's success. Michael Hicks of Android Central described the hardware as comfortable and well-balanced, stating the headset featured the highest resolution he had experienced on a virtual reality device. He characterized the compatibility with existing Android applications as a significant advantage but questioned whether this would be sufficient to overcome broader market disinterest in mixed reality devices.

Some early user feedback on Samsung's website praised the display quality and control systems, while other users reported that the user interface required additional refinement.

== See also ==
- Android XR, Google's operating system based on
- Apple Vision Pro, Apple's first mixed-reality headset
- Meta Quest Pro, Meta's first mixed-reality focused headset
- Samsung Gear VR, Samsung's prior VR headset
- Steam Frame, Valve's successor to the Valve Index
- List of virtual reality headsets
