= Windows Mixed Reality =

Mixed reality platform

- Simulated image of Windows Mixed Reality running on Microsoft HoloLens
- Operating system: Microsoft Windows
- Successor: Windows Mixed Reality Link
- Type: Mixed reality
- Website: www.microsoft.com/en-us/windows/windows-mixed-reality

Windows Mixed Reality (WMR) is a discontinued platform by Microsoft which provides augmented reality and virtual reality experiences with compatible head-mounted displays.

WMR supports a number of virtual and augmented reality headsets, including Microsoft HoloLens. In December 2023, Microsoft announced deprecation of WMR. In December 2024, Microsoft released a companion app, Windows Mixed Reality Link, a successor of Windows Mixed Reality to allow Meta Quest headsets to pair their headset to Windows.

== History ==
Its flagship device, Microsoft HoloLens, was announced at the "Windows 10: The Next Chapter" press event on January 21, 2015. The HoloLens provides an augmented reality experience where a live presentation of physical real-world elements is incorporated with that of virtual elements (referred to as "holograms" (Note: See also: Holography § False holograms) by Microsoft) such that they are perceived to exist together in a shared environment. A variant of Windows for augmented reality computers (which augment a real-world physical environment with virtual elements) Windows Mixed Reality features an augmented-reality operating environment in which any Universal Windows Platform app can run.

The platform is also used for virtual reality headsets designed for use on the Windows 10 Fall Creators Update, which are built to specifications implemented as part of Windows Mixed Reality, but lack support for augmented-reality experiences. In January 2023, Microsoft laid off entire teams which were developing HoloLens, Virtual Reality, and Mixed Reality products. On December 21, 2023, Microsoft announced that WMR has been deprecated and would be removed from Windows 11 in late-2024. On February 8, 2024, Microsoft announced Windows 11 Insider Preview Build 26052, which removes WMR components; the change officially took effect on Windows 11, version 24H2.

In April 2024, Meta Platforms announced Microsoft as a third-party hardware partner for its Android-based Horizon OS platform (as used on Meta Quest headsets), with plans for a "limited edition" Quest model under the Xbox brand.

In 2025, Microsoft employee Matthieu Bucchianeri released "Oasis", a reverse-engineered driver allowing native use of Windows Mixed Reality headsets on Windows 11 via SteamVR, including support for device-specific features such as eye-tracking on the HP Reverb G2 Omnicept Edition. In September 2025, Valve began to bundle the driver with the beta version of the SteamVR runtime. The driver does not currently support native Bluetooth, and only supports Nvidia graphics cards.

== Products ==
=== Microsoft HoloLens ===
The premier device for Windows Mixed Reality, Microsoft HoloLens is a smart-glasses headset that is a cordless, self-contained Windows 10 computer running Windows 10 Holographic. It uses various sensors, a high-definition stereoscopic 3D optical head-mounted display, and spatial sound to allow for augmented reality applications, with a natural user interface that the user interacts with through gaze, voice, and hand gestures. Codenamed "Project Baraboo", HoloLens had been in development for five years before its announcement in 2015, but was conceived earlier as the original pitch made in late 2007 for what would become the Kinect technology platform.

Microsoft has targeted HoloLens for release "in the Windows 10 timeframe", with the Microsoft HoloLens Development Edition to begin shipping March 30, 2016, available by application to developers in the United States and Canada for a list price of US$3000. Although the Development Edition is considered to be consumer-ready hardware, as of February 2016 Microsoft has not set a time frame for consumer availability of HoloLens, with HoloLens chief inventor Alex Kipman stating that HoloLens will have a consumer release only when the market is ready for it. Companies such as Samsung Electronics and Asus had expressed interest in working with Microsoft to produce their own mixed-reality products based on HoloLens. Intel made a direct competitor called Project Alloy with its system called "Merged Reality"; however, it has been cancelled as of September 22, 2017.

=== Immersive headsets ===
In October 2016 during a hardware event, Microsoft announced that multiple OEMs would release virtual reality headsets for the Windows Holographic platform, based on Microsoft reference designs enabling room-scale virtual reality without external sensors or components. In January 2017, prototypes were presented at Consumer Electronics Show for release later in the year, and Microsoft later announced that it planned to release development kits for such headsets during the Game Developers Conference. These devices would be supported by the Windows 10 "Creators Update". At the Game Developers Conference in 2017, Microsoft stated that it intended to support Windows Mixed Reality headsets on Xbox One in 2018, specifically noting the capabilities of the then-upcoming Xbox One X hardware revision, but the company later stated that it was initially focusing on PC platforms first, and that it wanted to focus on wireless VR solutions for consoles.

In October 2017, Microsoft officially launched Windows Mixed Reality and a lineup of third-party virtual reality headsets for use with the Windows 10 "Fall Creators Update", including launch hardware from Acer, Dell, HP, and Lenovo, and future products from Asus and Samsung. WMR-compatible VR headsets were officially referred to as Windows Mixed Reality immersive headsets, as the underlying ecosystem is referred to as Windows Mixed Reality regardless of whether or not they are compatible with mixed reality. All WMR headsets utilize inside-out tracking, which uses on-board sensors and cameras for motion tracking rather than external sensors.

Immersive headsets were compatible with mixed reality software obtained from Microsoft Store, universal apps, and SteamVR-compatible software. The ability to run desktop software was added on the Windows 10 "May 2019 Update".

Microsoft classifies its minimum and recommended system requirements for Windows Mixed Reality as "Windows Mixed Reality PCs" (60 fps) and "Windows Mixed Reality Ultra PCs" (90 fps). The minimum requirements specify an Intel Core i5-7200U or better for laptops, 8 GB of RAM, Intel HD Graphics 620 or better with DirectX 12 support, USB 3.0, HDMI or DisplayPort connections, and Bluetooth 4.0 support for controllers; The Verge noted that users "won't need a high-end gaming PC" to meet these recommendations.

== List of Windows Mixed Reality headsets ==
Name	Headset type	Release date	Display type	Resolution (per eye)	Field of view	Audio	Connectivity	Initial retail price (USD)	Platform compatibility	Input
Microsoft HoloLens	Augmented Reality	March 30, 2016 (Development Edition) (Development Edition 2) announced May 2, 2019	Proprietary	1268x720	34°	Integrated Speakers	Bluetooth 4.1 LE, IEEE 802.11ac	$3,000; $5,000 (Commercial Suite)	Windows Mixed Reality	Hand Gestures and Clicker
Microsoft HoloLens 2	Augmented Reality	Announced February 24, 2019	Proprietary	2560x1440	52°	Integrated Speakers	Bluetooth LE 5.0, 802.11 2x2 WiFi	US$3,500; US$125 per month Enterprise; US$99 per month Developer	Windows Mixed Reality; OpenXR	Eye tracking, Spatial Tracking, Hand Tracking
Lenovo Explorer**	Virtual Reality	October 17, 2017	LCD	1440x1440	110°	3.5 mm audio jack	1x USB 3.0; 1x HDMI 2.0; 1x Bluetooth 4.0	$349 ($449 with controllers)	Windows Mixed Reality; SteamVR; OpenXR	6DoF dual controllers tracked by HMD*
Acer AH101	Virtual Reality	October 17, 2017	LCD	1440x1440	100°	3.5 mm audio jack	1x USB 3.0; 1x HDMI 2.0; 1x Bluetooth 4.0	$399.99 (controllers included)	Windows Mixed Reality; SteamVR; OpenXR	6DoF dual controllers tracked by HMD*
Dell Visor	Virtual Reality	October 17, 2017	LCD	1440x1440	110°	3.5 mm audio jack	1x USB 3.0; 1x HDMI 2.0; 1x Bluetooth 4.0	$350 ($450 with controllers)	Windows Mixed Reality; SteamVR; OpenXR	6DoF dual controllers tracked by HMD*
HP WMR headset	Virtual Reality	October 17, 2017	LCD	1440x1440	100°	3.5 mm audio jack	1x USB 3.0; 1x HDMI 2.0; 1x Bluetooth 4.0	$449 (controllers included)	Windows Mixed Reality; SteamVR; OpenXR	6DoF dual controllers tracked by HMD*
Samsung Odyssey	Virtual Reality	November 6, 2017	AMOLED	1440x1600	110°	Integrated AKG headphones, built-in microphone	1x USB 3.0; 1X HDMI 2.0; 1x Bluetooth 4.0	$500	Windows Mixed Reality; SteamVR; OpenXR	6DoF dual controllers tracked by HMD (has a slightly different controller design to other WMR headsets)*
Asus HC102	Virtual Reality	February 20, 2018	LCD	1440x1440	95°	3.5 mm audio jack	1x USB 3.0; 1x HDMI 2.0; 1x Bluetooth 4.0	$399 (controllers included)	Windows Mixed Reality; SteamVR; OpenXR	6DoF dual controllers tracked by HMD*
Samsung Odyssey+	Virtual Reality	October 22, 2018	Anti-SDE AMOLED Display	1440x1600	110°	Integrated AKG headphones, built-in microphone	1x USB 3.0; 1X HDMI 2.0; Integrated Bluetooth 5.0 radio to communicate with controllers	$500	Windows Mixed Reality; SteamVR; OpenXR	6DoF dual controllers tracked by HMD (same controllers as the Samsung Odyssey)*
HP Reverb	Virtual Reality	May 6, 2019	LCD	2160x2160	114°	Removable headphones, two integrated microphones, 3.5 mm audio jack	1X USB 3.0; 1x DisplayPort 1.3; Integrated Bluetooth Radio to communicate with controllers	$599 Consumer Edition $649 Professional Edition	Windows Mixed Reality; SteamVR; OpenXR	6DoF dual controllers tracked by HMD*
Acer OJO 500	Virtual Reality	October 17, 2019	LCD	1440x1440	100°	Removable headphones, two integrated microphones, 3.5 mm audio jack	1x USB 3.0; 1x HDMI 2.0	$399.99 (controllers included)	Windows Mixed Reality; SteamVR; OpenXR	6DoF dual controllers tracked by HMD*
HP Reverb G2	Virtual Reality	October 31, 2020	LCD	2160x2160	114°	Valve 'off-ear' headphones, two integrated microphones	1x DisplayPort 1.3; 1x USB 3.0 Type-C	$600 (controllers included)	Windows Mixed Reality; SteamVR; OpenXR	6DoF dual controllers tracked by HMD (new controller design.*)

* Note: Windows Mixed Reality headsets are also compatible with Xbox One Controllers.

** The Lenovo Explorer is also sold in some regions as the Medion Erazer X1000 MR Glasses.

== Mixed Reality Portal ==
Mixed Reality Portal is a Universal Windows Platform app that serves as a front-end for Windows Mixed Reality. It features a 3D environment which users can explore, and customize with application shortcuts and virtual desktops. The feature originally launched with one environment, the Cliff House. A second, Skyloft, was added in the April 2018 Update.

== See also ==
- Android XR
- Meta Horizon OS
  - Version history
- visionOS
