= Tecno Phantom X =

Android-based Chinese smartphone

- Brand: Tecno Phantom
- Manufacturer: Tecno Mobile
- Type: Phablet
- Series: Phantom
- First released: 1 July 2021; 4 years ago
- Predecessor: Tecno Phantom 9
- Successor: Tecno Phantom X2
- Related: Tecno Phantom V Flip
- Compatible networks: 2G, 3G, 4G, 4G LTE
- Form factor: Slate
- Dimensions: 163.5 mm × 73.8 mm × 8.7 mm (6.44 in × 2.91 in × 0.34 in)
- Weight: 201 g (7.1 oz)
- Operating system: Android 11 with HiOS 7.6
- System-on-chip: MediaTek Helio G95
- CPU: Octa-core (2x2.05 GHz Cortex-A76 & 6x2.0 GHz Cortex-A55)
- GPU: Mali-G76 MC4
- Memory: 8 GB RAM
- Storage: 256 GB
- Removable storage: microSD
- Battery: 4700 mAh
- Charging: 33W
- Rear camera: 50 MP, f/1.9, (wide), 1/1.3", 1.2 μm, Dual Pixel PDAF, Laser AF; 13 MP, f/2.4, 50mm, (telephoto), PDAF, 2x optical zoom; 8 MP, f/2.3, 120° (ultrawide), 1/4.0", 1.12 μm, AF; Quad LED flash, HDR, panorama, 1080p@30fps; Features: Quad-LED flash, panorama, HDR Video: 4K@30/60fps, 1080p@30fps
- Front camera: 48 MP, f/2.2, (wide), 1/2.0", 0.8 μm; 8 MP, f/2.2, 105˚ (ultrawide), 1/4.0", 1.12 μm; Features: Dual-LED flash Video: 1080p@30fps
- Display: AMOLED capacitive touchscreen, 90Hz refresh rate, 19.5:9 aspect ratio, 1080p; 6.7 in (170 mm) 1080 × 2340 (385 ppi) 110.2 nits, ~91.3% screen-to-body ratio
- External display: Always On
- Sound: Loudspeaker
- Connectivity: Bluetooth 5.0; Wi-Fi 802.11 b/g/n/ac
- Data inputs: Sensors: Accelerometer; Fingerprint scanner; Gyroscope; Proximity sensor; Intelligent digital assistant; Face ID; Other: USB-C; USB On-The-Go; 3.5mm Headphone jack
- Model: AC8
- Website: Tecno Phantom X

Tecno Phantom X is an Android-based smartphone manufactured, released and marketed by Tecno Mobile as a standalone phantom sub-brand. The device was unveiled during an event held on 1 July 2021.

The Tecno Phantom X is an upgraded version of Tecno Phantom 9, coming with different features, including the OS, battery, camera, design, storage and memory. The phone has received generally favorable reviews, with critics mostly noting the battery, design, selfie camera and fast charging capacity. Critics, however, criticized the lack of stereo speakers.

== Design ==
The Phantom X has a design with a patterned glass back and Gorilla Glass 5 on the front, while the side frame is made of anodized aluminum. The device feature a vapor chamber cooling system attached to the chipset. For the front camera, the dual camera setup is embedded inside a dual punch-hole cut-out located at the left corner of the display.

Colours of Phantom X
Color	Name
	Van Gogh's Starry Night Blue
	Monet's Summer Garden

== Specifications ==
=== Hardware ===
==== Chipsets ====
The device utilize the MediaTek Helio G95 system-on-chip.

==== Display ====
The device features AMOLED display with 1080p support and a display size of 6.7-inches. It utilize an in-screen fingerprint sensor. The device has a curved edged display, super AMOLED panel and supports 90Hz refresh rate. It features 1080 × 2340 resolution with a 19.5:9 aspect ratio.

==== Storage ====
The device offer 8 GB of RAM with 256 GB for internal storage.

==== Battery ====
The device contain non-removable 4700 mAh Li-Po battery, supporting wired charging over USB-C at up to 33W.

==== Connectivity ====
The phone support 4G LTE, Wi-Fi 802.11 and Bluetooth 5.0.

==== Cameras ====
Camera specs on Phantom X
Wide	50 MP, f/1.9, 1/1.3", 1.2 μm, Dual Pixel PDAF, Laser AF DPAF, OIS
Telephoto	13 MP, f/2.4, 50mm, PDAF, 2x optical zoom
Ultrawide	8 MP, f/2.3, 120°, 1/4.0", 1.12 μm, AF
Front	48 MP, f/2.2, (wide), 1/2.0", 0.8 μm
Front	8 MP, f/2.2, 105˚ (ultrawide), 1/4.0", 1.12 μm

The phone's rear camera features a 50 MP wide sensor with laser autofocus, a 13 MP telephoto sensor with 2x optical zoom and an 8 MP ultrawide sensor. The front camera features a 48 MP wide sensor and 8 MP ultrawide sensor.

===== Supported video modes =====
The Phantom X supports the following video modes:

- 4K@30/60fps
- 1080p@30fps

=== Software ===
The device run on Android 11 based software overlay HiOS 7.6 at launch, and come bundled with a slew of apps like Peek Proof, Voice Changer, Phone cloner and Document correction among others.

== Reception ==
GSMArena awarded the phone 3.8 stars out of 5, noting that "Tecno is definitely trying to make a point with the Phantom X". Praise was directed towards the design, memory, selfie camera, battery and fast charging capacity. However, the lack of stereo speakers was criticized, while noting that "The display is good, but it lacks brightness".

Fisayo Fosudo praised the Phantom X for its design and fast charging capacity while noting that the device has "a gaming focused processor". He however criticized the device for the lack of stereo speakers, while noting that "the on-screen fingerprint reader and the face unlock method were kind of underwhelming".

George Kamau from Techweez gave a positive review of the Phantom X. Praise was directed towards the design, battery, performance and camera, while noting that "the Phantom X maxes out on its features and nails the fundamentals to deliver the best to consumers".

Dickson Otieno from Tech-ish praised the Phantom X for its under-display fingerprint scanner, battery and fast charging capacity. He opined further that "the processor will handle everything you throw at it quite well, however its 2021, and a 12nm process chip is old".

Duey Guison from Unbox noted that "the existence of the Phantom X is proof that TECNO has a lot of untapped potential as a brand that is rising globally".
