= Moto G (2026) =

Android smartphones by Motorola

- Manufacturer: Motorola Mobility
- Type: Smartphone
- Series: Moto G Family
- First released: November 13, 2025; 10 months ago – April 16, 2026; 5 months ago
- Predecessor: Moto G (2025)
- Form factor: Slate
- Operating system: Android 16
- Connectivity: 2G, 3G, 4G LTE and 5G

The Moto G (2026) is a series of Android smartphones developed by Motorola Mobility for the North American market. The lineup comprises four models released sequentially: the Moto G Play (2026), Moto G (2026), Moto G Power (2026), and Moto G Stylus (2026).

== Overview ==
The hardware configuration is split across the series. The entry-level and mid-range variants (Play, standard, and Power) utilize the MediaTek Dimensity 6300 system-on-chip paired with LCD panels supporting a 120 Hz refresh rate. The higher-end Moto G Stylus incorporates an AMOLED display, a Snapdragon 6 Gen 3 processor, and an active stylus.

All devices in the 2026 generation ship with Android 16. Motorola stated a support lifecycle of two major OS upgrades and three years of security patches.

== Release timeline ==
The rollout began in November 2025. The Moto G Play was released in the United States on November 13, 2025, followed by the standard Moto G on December 11, 2025. The Moto G Power launched on January 8, 2026. The Moto G Stylus completed the lineup on April 16, 2026.

== Model and regulatory identifiers ==
The four products belong to separate XT model families. Numbered suffixes distinguish carrier and regional versions, but do not necessarily indicate a different industrial design. Several variants may consequently appear under the same Federal Communications Commission equipment authorization.

Retail name	XT family	Documented variants	Internal name	FCC ID
Moto G (2026)	XT2613	XT2613-1, XT2613-2, XT2613-3	Utah26	IHDT56AT9
Moto G Play (2026)	XT2615	XT2615-1, XT2615-2, XT2615-3, XT2615V	Nevada26	IHDT56AT9
Moto G Power (2026)	XT2617	XT2617-1, XT2617-2, XT2617-3, XT2617V	Orlando26	IHDT56AU5
Moto G Stylus (2026)	XT2619	XT2619-1, XT2619-2, XT2619-3, XT2619V	Dallas26	IHDT56AT8

== Model comparison ==
Specification	Moto G Play (2026)	Moto G (2026)	Moto G Power (2026)	Moto G Stylus (2026)
Base model number	XT2615	XT2613	XT2617	XT2619
First retail availability	November 13, 2025	December 11, 2025	January 8, 2026	April 16, 2026
Display	6.7-inch IPS LCD, 1604 × 720 (HD+), 120 Hz		6.8-inch IPS LCD, 2388 × 1080 (FHD+), 120 Hz	6.7-inch AMOLED, 2712 × 1220 (1.5K), 120 Hz
Cover glass	Gorilla Glass 3		Gorilla Glass 7i	Gorilla Glass 3
System-on-chip	MediaTek Dimensity 6300 (6 nm)	MediaTek Dimensity 6300 (6 nm)	MediaTek Dimensity 6300 (6 nm)	Qualcomm Snapdragon 6 Gen 3 (SM6475-AB, 4 nm)
CPU	2 × 2.4 GHz Cortex-A76 + 6 × 2.0 GHz Cortex-A55	2 × 2.4 GHz Cortex-A76 + 6 × 2.0 GHz Cortex-A55	2 × 2.4 GHz Cortex-A76 + 6 × 2.0 GHz Cortex-A55	4 × 2.4 GHz Cortex-A78 + 4 × 1.8 GHz Cortex-A55
GPU	Mali-G57 MC2	Mali-G57 MC2	Mali-G57 MC2	Adreno 710
Memory	4 GB LPDDR4X		8 GB LPDDR4X	8 GB LPDDR5X
Internal storage	64 GB	128 GB	128 GB UFS 2.2	128 or 256 GB UFS 3.1
Expandable storage	microSD, up to 1 TB			
Rear cameras	32 MP main	50 MP main + 2 MP macro	50 MP main with OIS + 8 MP ultrawide/macro	50 MP Sony Lytia 700C main with OIS + 13 MP ultrawide/macro
Front camera	8 MP	32 MP		
Rear flash	LED flash			
Audio	Stereo speakers with Dolby Atmos; USB-C headphones	Stereo speakers with Dolby Atmos and Hi-Res Audio; 3.5 mm jack	Stereo speakers with Dolby Atmos and Hi-Res Audio; 3.5 mm jack	Stereo speakers with Dolby Atmos and Hi-Res Audio; USB-C headphones
Bluetooth	Bluetooth 5.3		Bluetooth 5.4	
Satellite positioning	GPS, A-GPS, LTEPP, SUPL, GLONASS and Galileo			GPS, A-GPS, GLONASS and Galileo
NFC	Yes			
Fingerprint reader	Side-mounted capacitive sensor in power button			Optical in-display sensor
Battery	5,200 mAh, non-removable			
Charging	18 W wired	30 W wired		68 W wired; 15 W wireless
Ingress protection and durability	IP52		IP68 and IP69; MIL-STD-810H testing	
Dimensions	167.15 × 76.40 × 8.44 mm		166.62 × 77.10 × 8.72 mm	162.15 × 74.78 × 8.29 mm
Weight	202 g		208 g	191 g
Colors	Pantone Tapestry	Pantone Slipstream; Pantone Cattleya Orchid	Pantone Evening Blue; Pantone Pure Cashmere	Pantone Coal Smoke; Pantone Lavender Mist
Stylus	None			Integrated active stylus with pressure and tilt sensitivity
Original operating system	Android 16			

== See also ==
- Moto G
- Motorola Mobility
- Android 16
