= Mark Lucovsky =

American software developer

- Education: California Polytechnic State University, San Luis Obispo (BS)
- Occupation: software developer
- Known for: supporting the engineers who built Microsoft Windows NT

Mark Lucovsky is an American software developer, technical writer, and configuration management specialist who was previously employed by Google as an Operating System Engineering Director. He also served as the General Manager of Operating Systems at Facebook, Prior to this, he worked at Microsoft and VMware. He is noted for being a support specialist on the team that designed and built the Windows NT operating system, which, starting with Windows XP, became the basis of all current Windows releases.

Lucovsky was awarded his bachelor's degree in computer science in 1983 from California Polytechnic State University, San Luis Obispo. He worked at Digital Equipment Corporation, where he came to the attention of Dave Cutler and Lou Perazzoli. When Cutler and Perazzoli moved to Microsoft to work on their next-generation operating system after the cancellation of the PRISM and MICA projects at Digital, they asked him to join them.

His only publicly disclosed contribution to Windows NT was an eighty-page manual that he wrote with Steve R. Wood defining the Windows application programming interfaces for software developers working on the Windows NT platform. He also managed check-ins to the Windows NT source code, tracking each check-in and discussing it with the developer before allowing it to be committed.

While never substantiated, Lucovsky has stated that Steve Ballmer, upon being informed by Lucovsky that he was about to leave Microsoft for Google, became enraged, picked up a chair and threw it across his office, hitting a table. Lucovsky also described Ballmer as saying several expletives, calling out his desire to "kill Google" — before resuming his attempts to persuade Lucovsky to stay at Microsoft.
