= Headset =

Headset may refer to:

== In arts and entertainment ==
- Headset, an electronica / hip-hop group of Dntel

== Electronic technologies ==
- Headset (audio), audio headphone(s), particularly with an attached microphone
- Head-mounted display, a video display mounted on a head strap or helmet
- VR headset, a set that all-in-one includes the audio headphones, the microphone and a virtual-reality device

== Other ==
- Headset (bicycle part), a bicycle part that connects the fork to the frame

== See also ==
- Handset
