= Lou Perazzoli =

American computer scientist

Lou Perazzoli is one of the initial architects for Windows NT made by Microsoft and later managed the core OS team for the first releases of Windows NT. He has a B.S in Mathematics and Computer Science (double major). He was one of the engineers which Dave Cutler took with him to Microsoft from Digital Equipment Corporation after the cancellation of the PRISM and MICA projects.
