= Tecno Phantom V Flip =

Android-based Chinese smartphone

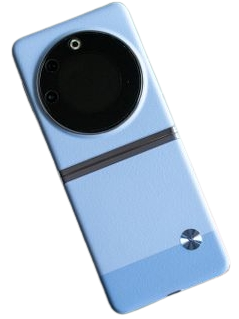
- Back of a Tecno Phantom V Flip
- Brand: Tecno Phantom
- Manufacturer: Tecno Mobile
- Type: Foldable smartphone
- Series: Phantom V
- First released: 24 September 2023; 3 years ago
- Compatible networks: 2G, 3G, 4G, 4G LTE, 5G
- Form factor: Foldable slate
- Dimensions: Unfolded; 171.7 mm (6.76 in) H; 74.1 mm (2.92 in) W; 7 mm (0.28 in) D; Folded; 88.8 mm (3.50 in) H; 74.1 mm (2.92 in) W; 15 mm (0.59 in) D
- Weight: 194 g (6.8 oz)
- Operating system: Android 13 with HiOS 13.5
- System-on-chip: MediaTek Dimensity 8050
- CPU: Octa-core (1x3.0 GHz Cortex-A78 & 3x2.6 GHz Cortex-A78 & 4x2.0 GHz Cortex-A55)
- GPU: Mali-G77 MC9
- Memory: 8 GB RAM LPDDR4X
- Storage: 256 GB UFS 3.1
- SIM: nanoSIM
- Battery: 4000 mAh
- Charging: 45W
- Rear camera: 64 MP, f/1.7, 25mm (wide), 1/1.73", 0.8 μm, PDAF + 13 MP, f/2.2, (ultrawide), 1/3", 1.12 μm, PDAF, LED flash, HDR, panorama, 4K@30fps, 1080p@30/60fps
- Front camera: 32 MP, f/2.5, 24mm (wide), 1/2.8", 0.8 μm, PDAF, LED flash, 2K@30fps, 1080p@30/60fps
- Display: Foldable LTPO AMOLED, 1080 × 2640, 6.9 in (18 cm), ~22:9 aspect ratio, 413 ppi, 120 Hz refresh rate
- External display: AMOLED, 466 × 466, 1.32 in (3.4 cm), 352 ppi
- Sound: Stereo speakers
- Connectivity: Bluetooth 5.1, A2DP, LE; Wi-Fi 802.11 a/b/g/n/ac/6, dual-band
- Data inputs: Sensors: Accelerometer; Fingerprint scanner; Gyroscope; Hall sensor; Proximity sensor; Magnetometer; Intelligent digital assistant; Face ID; Other: USB-C
- Model: AD11
- Website: Tecno Phantom V Flip

The Tecno Phantom V Flip is an Android-based smartphone manufactured, released and marketed by Tecno Mobile as part of the phantom sub-brand. The device was unveiled during an event held in Lagos, Nigeria on 27 September 2023.

== Design ==
The two rear panels of the Phantom V Flip are covered in vegan leather, and the frame is made of aluminum. The hinge of the device is made of steel, while the internal screen has a thin plastic film and a plastic bezel around it. The foldable screen is covered by a thin film, and the panel has a small punch hole for the front camera. The dual-LED front flashes of the device are embedded in the top plastic bezel, next to the earpiece.

Colours of Phantom V Flip
Color	Name
	Mystic Dawn
	Iconic Black

== Specifications ==
=== Hardware ===
==== Chipsets ====
The device utilize the MediaTek Dimensity 8050 system-on-chip.

==== Display ====
The device features an AMOLED display with Full HD+ support and a display size of 6.9-inches. It utilizes a side-mounted fingerprint sensor and supports a 120Hz refresh rate. It features 1080 × 2640 resolution with a 22:9 aspect ratio and a 1.32-in cover screen.

==== Storage ====
The device offers 8 GB of LPDDR4X RAM with 256 GB of UFS 3.1 internal storage.

==== Battery ====
The device contains a non-removable 4000 mAh Li-Po battery, supporting wired charging over USB-C at up to 45W.

==== Connectivity ====
The phone supports the 5G network, Wi-Fi 802.11 and Bluetooth 5.1.

==== Cameras ====
Camera specs on Phantom V Flip
Wide	64 MP, f/1.7, 25mm, 1/1.73", 0.8 μm, PDAF
Ultrawide	13 MP, f/2.2, 1/3", 1.12 μm, PDAF
Front	32 MP, f/2.5, 24mm, 1/2.8", 0.8 μm, PDAF

The phone's rear camera features a 64 MP wide sensor, a 13 MP ultrawide sensor, and a 32 MP front camera.

===== Supported video modes =====
The Phantom V Flip supports the following video modes:

- 4K@30fps
- 1080p@30/60fps

=== Software ===
The device run on Android 13 based software overlay HiOS 13.5 at launch, and come bundled with a slew of apps like memory anti-aging, memory slimming, EllaGPT and lighting multi-window among others.

== Reception ==
GSMArena awarded the phone 4.0 stars out of 5, noting that "the Tecno Phantom V Flip is an affordable foldable smartphone with a ton of premium features across the board". Praise was directed towards its leather design, both screens, performance, camera and processor. However, the lack of ingress protection, HDR10 support and EIS for 4K videos was criticized, while noting that "the Phantom V Flip may not be a perfect phone, but it does come at a perfect price".

Harish Jonnalagadda from Android Central gave the Phantom V Flip a score of 3.8/5 and stated that "the foldable has a striking design with a unique camera island that houses the cover screen, and the build quality is on par with its rivals". He, however, criticized the cameras and noted they "are strictly average" while adding that the "software lacks polish".

Hadley Simons from Android Authority gave the Phantom V Flip a score of 6/10, describing the performance as solid and praising the selfie camera flash, design, and battery. However, he criticized the device for lack of IP rating and noted that the ultrawide camera is disappointing.

Duey Guison from Unbox noted that "Tecno made a bold statement with the Phantom V Flip with its competitive pricing for a flip foldable".
