= Hiroshi Lockheimer =

Software engineer and business executive

- Hiroshi Lockheimer in 2026
- Born: 1975 (age 50–51); Tokyo, Japan
- Occupations: Senior Vice President of Android, Chrome, ChromeOS & Play at Google
- Website: Twitter profile

Hiroshi Lockheimer (born 1975) is a Japanese-American software engineer and business executive. He is one of the founding members of the Android team at Google, which was created after Google acquired the mobile operating system. At Google, Lockheimer was the senior vice president of Android, Chrome, ChromeOS & Play, overseeing the company's range of mobile products, until a corporate reorganization in April 2024.

== Early life ==
Lockheimer was born in 1975 and grew up in Tokyo, he is the son of a Japanese mother and German father. He lived in Japan until the age of 18. In 1993, Lockheimer moved to the United States to enter Rice University in Houston, Texas. Lockheimer didn't enjoy his time in Texas and dropped out to move back to Tokyo to study programming. Lockheimer returned to the United States in 1997, and three years later became the first employee of Andy Rubin's start-up, called Danger Inc.

== Google ==
Lockheimer was approached by Andy Rubin after Android was acquired by Google. In 2015, Lockheimer described his interaction with Rubin to Fast Company:

He knew my interest in consumer devices, and specifically wireless devices. He called me up and said, ‘Hey, you know, we’re doing this thing at Google now, we got acquired. I can’t really tell you what we’re doing, but I think you’re really going to be excited about it. You should come talk to us'.

Lockheimer joined Google's Android team in April 2006, 19 months before the public unveiling of Android 1.0. Lockheimer initially started as Android's executive director, and was promoted to vice president of engineering in 2011. From October 2015 to April 2024, Lockheimer was Google's senior vice president of Android, Chrome, ChromeOS & Play.

== Career ==
- Be, Inc., manager, 1997–2000
- Danger, Inc., first employee, 2000–2000
- Palm, Inc., program manager, 2000–2001
- Good Technology, engineering manager, 2001–2004
- Microsoft IPTV, platform manager, 2005–2006
- Google, executive director, 2006–2011
- Google, vice president of engineering, 2011–2015
- Google, senior vice president of Android, Chrome, ChromeOS & Play, 2015–2024
