= Meta Horizon OS version history =

History of the operating system for Meta VR headset

Meta Horizon OS has gone through several changes since the release of the Oculus Rift DK1 on March 29, 2013.

The operating system has been updated on a roughly monthly basis since the v1.0 release in 2016, and was gradually ported from a proprietary embedded operating system to Android starting in 2015, first for the Samsung Gear VR and later for its own headsets. The updates often include experimental or undocumented features.

== Overview ==
From 2013 to 2015, the then-proprietary firmware and SDK for Windows PCs were developed exclusively for the Rift by Oculus VR, which was acquired in 2014 by Facebook (now Meta Platforms) and renamed as Reality Labs. Starting in 2014, the company ported the Oculus Home, Oculus Store and Oculus Cinema (later Video) apps to Android for use on the Samsung Gear VR headset, allowing Samsung Galaxy phone users to access VR games and apps made available through the Store app. In 2018, Facebook launched the Oculus Go, which was both the first standalone headset and the first Android-based headset from the company. Subsequent headsets from Facebook used this combination of Android with the company's proprietary user interface and apps, even as the company was renamed in 2022 as Meta Platforms and the headsets were rebranded accordingly. In 2024, Meta announced that the combined operating system stack would be named as Meta Horizon OS and licensed to select third party hardware manufacturers.

== Version history ==
Previous release	Current release	Current beta release

=== Pre-1.0 (2012–2015) ===
Version	Build	Release date	Notes	Features	Release notes
v0.1					
v0.2	Oculus SDK 0.2.3	July 4, 2013		Linux support to the Oculus C++ SDK and OculusWorldDemo	
v0.2	Oculus SDK 0.2.5	October 11, 2013			
v0.3	Oculus Rift SDK 0.3.1 Preview	April 15, 2014			
v0.4	Oculus SDK 0.4.0	July 24, 2014			
v0.4	Oculus Mobile SDK 0.4.0	November 12, 2014	First release for Samsung Gear VR (w/ Samsung Galaxy Note 4)	asynchronous timewarp	
v0.4	Oculus PC SDK 0.4.3 Beta	October 24, 2014		experimental Linux support; Unity Free	
v0.4	Oculus Mobile SDK 0.4.1	January 7, 2015			
v0.5	Oculus Mobile SDK 0.5	March 31, 2015	for Samsung Note 4 - Gear VR		
v0.6	Oculus PC SDK 0.6.0	May 15, 2015			
v0.7	Oculus PC SDK 0.7	August 20, 2015		replacement of Extended Mode with Direct Driver Mode	
v0.8	Oculus PC SDK 0.8	October 21, 2015			

=== 1.0 era (2016–2019) ===
Version	Build	Release date	Notes	Features	Release notes
v1.0	Oculus Audio SDK 1.0.2	February 5, 2016			
v1.0	Oculus OVRLipSync for Unity 5 1.0.0-beta	February 10, 2016			
v1.0	Oculus Mobile SDK 1.0.0.1	March 1, 2016			
v1.0	System Activities/VrApi 1.0.2.2	March 16, 2016			
v1.3	Rift 1.3.1	April 4, 2016		Sensor firmware update; bug fixes	
v1.3	Rift 1.3.2	April 18, 2016		support for installing Oculus and VR applications to a different drive; bug fixes	
v1.4	Oculus App 1.4	May 19, 2016		improvements to performance and stability; bug fixes; AUD, CAD, Euro, Pound, and Yen currencies supported by all games	
v1.4	Oculus SDK 1.4	May 20, 2016			
v1.4	Platform SDK 1.2	May 20, 2016			
v1.5	Oculus App 1.5	June 23, 2016		improvements to notifications	
v1.5	Oculus PC SDK 1.5	June 24, 2016			
v1.5	Unreal Engine 4 Integration 1.5	June 24, 2016			
v1.5	Oculus Platform SDK 1.5	June 24, 2016			
v1.5	Oculus Utilities for Unity 5 Version 1.5	June 30, 2016			
v1.6	Oculus App 1.6	July 14, 2016		addition of "Coming Soon" section to Oculus Store and Library; option to choose how much bandwidth to use for Oculus downloads; automatic resumption of download if interrupted; automatic updates for installed apps; user ratings for apps and games in Oculus Store	
v1.6	Oculus App 1.6.1	July 29, 2016		bug fix	
v1.6	Oculus SDK for Windows 1.6	July 15, 2016			
v1.6	Unreal Engine 4 Integration 1.6	July 15, 2016			
v1.6	Oculus Platform SDK 1.6	July 15, 2016			
v1.6	Oculus Utilities for Unity 5 Version 1.6	July 29, 2016			
v1.7	Unreal Engine 4 Integration 1.7.0	August 11, 2016		adaptive viewport scaling with configurable min/max (Rift only); Oculus Platform SDK support to mobile VR applications; Blueprint for Oculus Platform entitlement checks (available in SI 1.6).; cylinder TimeWarp overlay support (Gear VR only); ability develop using GearVR plugin and Mobile renderer on the PC using the Oculus Rift	
v1.7	Oculus Platform SDK 1.7.0	August 11, 2016		VoIP Filters; automatic Developer and Admin Entitlements to all apps in organization; minor improvements, bug fixes, and updates	
v1.7	Oculus SDK for Windows 1.7.0	August 11, 2016			
v1.7	Oculus Utilities for Unity 5 1.7	August 24, 2016		bug fixes	
v1.8	Unreal Engine Integration 1.8	September 14, 2016		support for the Oculus Guardian System; depth ordering support; cubemap support (mobile only); Blueprint for retrieving Oculus ID/Username	
v1.8	Oculus Platform SDK 1.8	September 14, 2016		Quickmatch matchmaking mode	
v1.8	Oculus SDK for Windows 1.8	September 14, 2016			
v1.8	Oculus Utilities for Unity 5 1.8	September 15, 2016			
v1.9	Oculus App 1.9	October 13, 2016		Star ratings on Oculus Store for all apps, games and experiences; performance improvements, stability enhancement, and bug fixes	
v1.9	Oculus Platform SDK 1.9	October 19, 2016			
v1.9	Oculus SDK for Windows 1.9	October 19, 2016			
v1.9	Oculus Utilities for Unity 5 1.9	November 1, 2016			
v1.10	Rift 1.10	November 16, 2016	first combined update for Rift	Asynchronous Space Warp; write reviews for apps and games in Oculus Store; performance improvements, stability enhancement, and bug fixes	
v1.10	Rift 1.10.1	December 2, 2016		setup for Touch using the Oculus app; Guardian System for boundaries; Experimental support for 2-sensor 360º and 3-sensor roomscale configurations; custom Oculus Avatars; performance improvements, stability enhancement, and bug fixes	
v1.10	Rift 1.10.2	December 5, 2016		performance improvements, stability enhancement, and bug fixes	
v1.11	Rift 1.11	February 3, 2017		option to skip updating the controller firmware when repeating Oculus setup; better visibility and hand animations in Guardian System; instructions for Oculus sensor positioning during setup; experimental roomscale and experimental 360º support	
v1.12	Rift 1.12	February 27, 2017		ability to report user reviews as spam in Oculus Store; finish installing new apps and games when they're done downloading while in VR (requires admin privileges in Windows); improvements: tracking quality with Oculus Rift and Touch; support for Unity content; support for Unreal Engine UE4 content	
v1.13	Rift 1.13	March 23, 2017		ability to enroll in Public Test Channel; ability to move forward by looking at skip button; update to First Contact; bug fixes	
v1.13	Rift Debug Tool 1.13	March 28, 2017			
v1.15	Rift 1.15	May 22, 2017		improved 360 degree tracking and roomscale support	
v1.16	Rift 1.16	June 15, 2017		support for Mixed reality capture; redesign of update interface; ability to report issues in VR; addition of Cityscape environment; ability to see whether friends are using Rift or Gear VR; option to choose one of four supported languages during setup of Rift or Touch; support for 360º-only content, with notifications for 360-only games and apps and compatibility with headset configurations; bug fixes	
v1.19	Rift SI 1.19	October 5, 2017		Camera Calibration Tool update in Mixed reality capture; bug fixes	
v1.20	Rift SI 1.20	October 23, 2017		Dynamic Bundle Pricing in Oculus Store	
v1.21	Rift SI 1.21	December 6, 2017		wishlist option in desktop; beginning of Rift Core 2.0 Beta; UI redesign replacing the existing Universal Menu and Home with a new Touch-native interface for Dash, Oculus Home, and Oculus desktop app; requirement for Windows users to upgrade to Windows 10 to support some Core 2.0 features; persistent overlay system for Dash; use of Windows desktop apps in VR; notification redesign in Oculus desktop app	
v1.22	Rift SI 1.22	January 18, 2018		install and manage VR apps across more than one hard drive or Windows folder; detailed information about usage of each app; 8x MSAA support; Rift Core 2.0 Beta; Graphics settings made into its own section in Options menu; performance and bug fixes	
v1.23	Rift SI 1.23	February 5, 2018		add apps and games to wishlist in VR; Rift Core 2.0 Beta; create and customize multiple homes; bug fixes	
v1.24	Rift SI 1.24	March 5, 2018		Installed apps can now be moved between library locations; Rift Core 2.0 Beta; performance improvements and bugfixes	
v1.25	Rift SI 1.25	April 13, 2018		populating search bar with recommended “trending” apps and recent searches; Rift Core 2.0 Beta; Updates tab and the ability to sort apps by comfort/location in the Dash Library panel; Improved virtual keyboard input; mouse cursor in Dash	
v1.26	Rift SI 1.26	May 4, 2018		public, discoverable events on Rift; Rift Core 2.0 Beta; improvements to Oculus Desktop usability in Dash	
v1.27	Rift SI 1.27	May 30, 2018		updates to Oculus desktop search; options for sorting and filtering in library; results page to browse, sort, and filter results in Oculus desktop search; notifications for friend activity and content updates (experimental); Rift Core 2.0 Beta; overlay UI for Dash panels to show distance and scale while position them with the thumbstick; Dash stability improvement	
v1.28	Rift SI 1.28	June 26, 2018		support across core software for Danish, Finnish, Dutch, Swedish, Spanish (Spain), Spanish (Latin American), Italian, Norwegian, and Polish; per-application language pack support for developers in Oculus desktop app; Rift Core 2.0 Beta; new custom hair, skin shading, clothing, and eyewear designs in the Avatar Editor; ability to invite up to eight people to Home, but user's Home is locked while guests are present; experimental support for broadcasting Oculus Desktop in multiplayer; new "Movement" section in Home to set up options for moving around in VR, including Walk Mode, Smooth Turning, and Snap Turning	
v1.29	Rift SI 1.29	August 2, 2018		Rift Core 2.0 Beta; new Belt UI design for Dash; new contextual menus for panels within Dash; basic animation support for custom assets in Home; improvements to display of 3rd party apps in Library	
v1.30	Rift 1.30	August 23, 2018		Rift Core 2.0 Beta; greater graphics card support for ability to stream desktop content directly to displays in Home; Long Press for Oculus Button to avoid accidental pressing; ability to bulk import applications and re-add previously deleted apps in Library; design updates	
v1.31	Rift 1.31	October 10, 2018		Exit of Rift Core 2.0 out of Beta; new "Experiments" section; playback of skinned animations for user generated content; Customer Developer Items	
v1.32	Rift 1.32	November 6, 2018		new Dash rollover menu; performance improvements to Dash; add embedded panels to custom 3D objects for importing to Home (solo users only); Updated fonts and localizations	
v1.33	Rift 1.33	December 11, 2018		new system keyboard for Dash; new textures and lighting for Dash's background environment; ability to report offensive behavior and content within Home	
v1.34	Rift 1.34	January 22, 2019		livestream directly to Facebook page using Dash; pressing “Edit Avatar” tab on the Social Panel in Dash opens Avatar Editor; option to make Home public; updated multiplayer features in Home to allow for play and redesign while friends are present; ability to use Avatar Editor in Home while friends are present	
v1.35	Rift 1.35	February 12, 2019		ability to import one's own Home geometry as a replacement for the standard “cabin” geometry; performance improvements and additional bug fixes, including a Dash issue impacting memory clock speed on NVIDIA cards	
v1.36	Rift 1.36	March 6, 2019		new sound objects; link between own Home and other Homes using Gateway feature; ability to share a link to one's own Home; Miscellaneous graphics updates	
v1.37	Rift 1.37	May 9, 2019		UI and Tutorial refresh; Avatars updated to simulate eye and mouth movement; new outfits and customization options like eye color and lipstick	
v1.38	Rift and Rift S 1.38	June 12, 2019	First update for Oculus Rift S	ability to rename Homes; relocate items directly from the inventory menu to move or reposition them; reduced download sizes; Homes UI refresh	

=== Quest and Rift era (2019–2020) ===
Version	Build	Release date	Notes	Features	Release notes
v3.56	Quest, Go and Gear VR build 7.0	July 22, 2019	First update for Quest and Go; first to support Android-based VR hardware, starting with Android 7.0 (Nougat)	overall audio experience; ability to enable or disable microphone in VR; persistent search bar in-VR; opt-in to new features under Experiments section; boundaries adjustment in Guardian settings; adjust floor height in Guardian settings; set and switch between multiple Guardians in the same room; pair with Bluetooth keyboards and gamepads to type and navigate in VR; Oculus Store UI refresh; Oculus Store filtering based on price, comfort or genre; wishlist saving for potential purchases; ability to Follow favorite games, developers and genres in Feed; ability to like or dislike apps or games after usage; hide items from Feed; ability to adjust fit, focus and clarity in setup (Quest only); auto-pair headset from Quest mobile app (Quest only); improved tracking for Touch controllers; phone notifications for events soon to start; first to support black-and-white passthrough (Quest only)	
v3.56	Rift and Rift S build 1.39	July 22, 2019		ability to set Passthrough+ session length to “unlimited”; automatic detection of floor height by Guardian; virtual keyboard will now automatically open when selecting a text field; history of Homes visited in last 30 days; automatic notifications for Home reward pack; Home gateways to load directly in favorite app; camera accessible from Home menu; improved tracking for Touch controllers; ability to use both Touch controllers when using keyboard, Oculus Store, and Library	
v8	Quest, Go and Gear VR build 8.0	August 19, 2019			
v8	Rift and Rift S build 1.40	August 19, 2019		new button to the Dash belt to select and view individual Virtual Desktop panels; stability and performance for Virtual Desktops; Ability to clear Guardian boundary history; Guardian boundaries accuracy confirmation menu upon setup; removal of need to confirm forward direction during setup; update of design, performance and load times for Oculus Store; Collect All button to collect all Oculus Home rewards at once; bug fixes	
v9	Quest, Go and Gear VR build 9.0	September 30, 2019		upgrade of Passthrough on Quest to Passthrough+, which enhances estimations of the depth, size and distance of objects in real world environment; option to turn off Quest's standard inside-out tracking; addition of Tracking adjustment options; option to download 50+ owned Oculus Go- or Gear VR-native apps from library to play on Quest; adjust and customize notification preferences from in-VR; manually start an over the air (OTA) software update in-VR; ability to perform a remote wipe on formerly-possessed Quest headset; additional security steps for credit card authentication to comply with EU regulations; "People You May Know" suggestions in-VR (experimental); ability to see high scores of friends (experimental, in both mobile app and in-VR); performance fixes	
v9	Rift and Rift S build 1.41	September 30, 2019			
v10	Quest, Go and Gear VR build 10.0	October 14, 2019		support for all generations of Chromecast and some Chromecast built-in devices; ability to start a casting session in-VR; improvements to Chromecast latency, connection stability and picture quality; clarification to in-VR notifications that preferences set in-VR are different from those set in the mobile app; in-VR settings for personalization; curated set of trending and popular videos of people playing games (experimental); list of “The Best 5” of a certain type of content (experimental)	
v10	Rift and Rift S build 1.42	October 14, 2019			
v11	Quest, Go and Gear VR build 11.0	November 11, 2019		remote rendering in Oculus Link; new Environments feature; achievements from friends in VR feed; favorite or hide apps/genres; pending or in-process app installs complete before headset goes to sleep; autofill Search bar that populates when hovering over an autocomplete tag	
v11	Rift and Rift S build 1.43	November 11, 2019		remote rendering in Oculus Link; new Environments feature; achievements from friends in VR feed; favorite or hide apps/genres; pending or in-process app installs complete before headset goes to sleep; autofill Search bar that populates when hovering over an autocomplete tag	
v12	Quest, Go and Gear VR build 12.0	December 9, 2019	Final update for Gear VR	AMD GPU support for Oculus Link; system audio separated from VR audio; changing Oculus Link graphics settings supported by Oculus Debug tool; in-VR "tour guide" feature enabled in phone casting, allowing for users to guide each other through first VR experiences; ability to add a payment method in VR (PayPal and credit card); ability to choose the types of information that individual apps can share; predictive live update of results while typing in Search; app permission manager; Voice Commands (Beta); hand tracking (experimental); Facebook social features (also for Rift and Rift S); Chats; Join Facebook friends in VR; sharing photos, videos, and livestreaming to Facebook; User-created Events; parties for all Oculus friends (no longer invite-only); Messenger friends; Privacy policy update	
v12	Rift and Rift S build 12.0	December 9, 2019			
v13	Quest and Go build 13.0	February 3, 2020		ability to reset guardian from within Dash while using Link; button to enable Oculus Link added to Quest system menu bar; option to enable passthrough to find controllers when switching from hand tracking to controller use; option to enable automatic transitioning between hand tracking and controller; Remote rendering support for Unity; option to start a party direct from a live event's detail page; event hosts allowed to let guests invite their own friends; ability to see all who express "interest" in an event and all users who have been invited; Scoreboards app; bug fixes	
v13	Rift and Rift S build 13.0	February 3, 2020			
v14	Quest and Go build 14.0	February 24, 2020		Quest microphone re-enabled for use with Link; dedicated Oculus Link button added to the Oculus Quest menu bar; Link audio and microphone volume controls; no further requirement that Quest software and the PC software have matching version numbers, only within one version of each other	
v14	Rift and Rift S build 14.0	February 24, 2020			
v15	Quest and Go build 15.0	March 23, 2020		option to test Oculus Link connection during setup; remotely join parties through invite links using the mobile app; notification that a blocked user or a user who has blocked oneself is participating in a party one is joining; no head-locking for in-VR notifications; speech-to-text option added to the in-VR keyboard (experimental); Passthrough Shortcut option; Redesigned Universal Menu (opt-in); Multiple Window Support for Oculus Browser; bug fixes	
v15	Rift and Rift S build 15.0	March 23, 2020			
v16	Quest and Go build 16.0	April 13, 2020		option to swap Oculus and Menu button functionality between Touch controllers; ability to turn off or lower the intensity of Touch controller vibration; ability to set roomscale Guardian boundaries using hand tracking; passthrough enabled as home environment; option in the Facebook mobile app to "see in VR" to open select web content in headset; send and receive clickable links through Chats, opening Oculus browser; Opening a new chat in VR automatically opens the keyboard; chat threads for all friends invited for user-created events; new friends panel; confirmation dialog box when unsubscribing from an event; bug fixes	
v16	Rift and Rift S build 16.0	April 13, 2020	final update for Rift and Rift S		

=== Oculus Quest era (2020–2022) ===
Version	Build	Release date	Notes	Features	Release notes
v17	Quest and Go build 17.0	May 18, 2020		automatic detection of objects in Roomscale playspace during setup of Guardian; option to see the floor bounds for Guardian; search for bundles in the Oculus Store (experimental); toggle the red dot indicator on/off; large preview of photo/video capture prior to clicking Oculus button to share; Hand tracking for Oculus Quest moved out of Experimental status into general release; Voice Dictation moved out of Experimental status into general release; bug fixes	
v17	PC build 17.0	May 11, 2020			
v18	Quest and Go build 18.0	June 29, 2020		Universal Menu and Multi-Browser Support update; Combined Library and Apps as single panel; universal menu available as overlay in select apps; VR tooltips; predictive text in Oculus in-VR keyboard; ability to change the color of Guardian Boundary; ability to refine in-VR notification preferences; ability to share in-VR content or invites via Messenger; Voice Commands (Beta) available to all US English-speaking users; Voice Commands redesign and update with more commands	
v18	PC build 18.0	June 29, 2020			
v18	Oculus Go build 18.01	September, 28th 2020			
v18	Oculus Go build 18.02	December 7, 2020			
v18	Oculus Go build 18.03	March 15, 2021			
v18	Oculus Go build 18.04	June 15, 2021			
v18	Oculus Go build 18.05	September 20, 2021	most recent supported security update for Oculus Go		
v19	Quest build 19.0	July 20, 2020		option for profile discoverability by Facebook name (depending on audience selected in privacy settings); option to invite friends, regardless whether they are using a headset; Public Parties: voice over IP (VOIP) call discoverable to people outside of Oculus friends list (up to 8 people); Travel Together; private and public party size set to 8 users maximum; ability to see and edit Block List; visual representation of one's hands when using Touch controllers; ability to take a photo in-VR using the Touch controller; Japanese keyboard layout option; ability for app developers to access the Oculus keyboard in-app for text entry; 4 graphics profile settings for Oculus Link: Automatic, Performance, Balance and Quality (PC only)	
v19	PC build 19.0	July 20, 2020			
v20	Quest build 20.0	August 17, 2020		integration of Unity; choose to mute anyone else in the party on a person-by-person basis; image stabilization for in-VR recording (PC only); ability to hide the ‘Activate Oculus Link’ modal (PC only)	
v20	PC build 20.0	August 17, 2020		integration of Unity; choose to mute anyone else in the party on a person-by-person basis; image stabilization for in-VR recording (PC only); ability to hide the ‘Activate Oculus Link’ modal (PC only)	
v20	Quest build 20.01	October 12, 2021		integration of Unity; choose to mute anyone else in the party on a person-by-person basis; image stabilization for in-VR recording (PC only); ability to hide the ‘Activate Oculus Link’ modal (PC only)	
v23	Quest build 23.0	November 13, 2020	first update to support Quest 2	90 Hz refresh rate set as native default for system software; opt-in for apps to 90 Hz refresh rate; Oculus Move fitness tracking; access to Voice Activity in-headset; Voice Dictation from search bar; automatic punctuation; expansion of voice dictation, voice commands and predictive text to English speakers in Canada; font size adjustment option in VR; casting to desktop web browser; ability to record media on phone when casting to the Oculus Quest mobile app; upload and download files to and from headset via Browser, with support for YouTube, Dropbox and Google Drive; bug reporting; option to automatically download previously downloaded Quest 1 apps to Quest 2; Pixel density improvement (Quest 1 only); Oculus Link out of beta (PC only)	
v23	PC build 23.0	November 13, 2020			
v25	Quest build 25.0	February 1, 2021		access to Messenger on Oculus for users who have logged into Quest and Quest 2 with their Facebook account; chat on Messenger with Facebook friends regardless if they are in VR; Stationary Guardian 2.0, including removal of grid; Passthrough Shortcut out of beta; Universal Menu Overlay across all apps (beta); redesign of Universal Menu, including viewing Party details and leaving a party directly; ability to use Bluetooth mouse in VR; menu navigation tutorial; ability to trim length of captured video in edit mode (if 30 seconds or more); toggle refresh rate to 80 Hz or 90 Hz when using Link with USB-2 cable (PC only)	
v25	PC build 25.0	February 1, 2021			
v26	PC build 26.0	February 22, 2021		virtual couch overlay for real couch in VR (experimental); point and pinch gesture improvements	
v26	Oculus Quest build 26.0	February 22, 2021		virtual couch overlay for real couch in VR (experimental); point and pinch gesture improvements	
v27	Oculus Quest build 27.0	March 22, 2021		OS updated to Android 10; Bug fixes	
v28	Oculus Quest build 28.0	April 19, 2021		Oculus Air Link (experimental)	
v28	PC build 28.0	April 19, 2021	Most recent PCVR-specific build	Oculus Air Link (experimental)	
v29	Oculus Quest build 29.0	May 17, 2021		Multi-User Accounts and App Sharing for Quest 1; ability to record headset mic audio while recording video or casting in VR; viewing Phone Notifications in VR (initially for iOS); Files App; quick access to Passthrough through a new shortcut; Light Theme for Quest 1 and quest 2 (experimental); redesign of Universal menu; Night Display; 120 Hz support for Oculus Link and Oculus Air Link with Quest 2 (experimental)	
v30	Oculus Quest build 30.0	June 15, 2021		swapping microphone between Party and game chat; multi-tasking between 2D apps in Oculus Home on Quest 2 and Quest (experimental); color correction; raise and adjust view while physically seated (experimental); Oculus Air Link for Quest 1 (experimental); using Voice Commands to hear Oculus events; performance and stability fixes; improvements to search	
v31	Oculus Quest build 31.0	July 20, 2021		invitation to friends from recently used apps in Universal menu; invitation links in Quest mobile app; improvements to Air Link; Reactions to Messenger messages in VR; USB-C headphones support for Quest 2; password saving in Browser; dedicated security settings page; fixes; redesign of Universal Menu for larger text	
v32	Oculus Quest build 32.0	August 23, 2021		redesign of Oculus Move targets; app gifting; automatic sync of images and videos to Quest mobile app; changes to multitasking, permissions and notifications; single list for Oculus and Messenger friends	
v33	Oculus Quest build 33.0	September 13, 2021		Guardian history; safe browsing warnings for potentially harmful websites in Browser; text and image improvements in Link and Air Link; up to three currently running 2D apps in Universal Menu; granular app-level notifications preferences; auto-correct features and next-word prediction on virtual keyboard	
v34	Oculus Quest build 34.0	November 1, 2021		"Space Sense" in Guardian to see things like people and pets entering play space (Quest 2 only, not available for Stationary Guardian); personal workspace environment in Horizon Home; 2D apps in Oculus Store; notifications from Quest apps in Android version of Quest mobile app; secure pairing for Air Link enabled (Windows 10 only); more commands for Voice Commands; Quest Public Test Channel (PTC) for early access to upcoming releases; bug fixes	
v35	Oculus Quest build 35.0	November 29, 2021		Mobile mixed reality camera casting; Oculus Cloud Backup; Multiple Accounts on Quest; Phone Notification Deep Links to Browser in VR; Messenger Calling in VR; ability to adjust the ‘Up’ angle of the thumbstick; microphone button within the browser address bar to access dictation; more select 2D apps for in-VR use, including Miro, Monday.com and MURAL; ability for developers to add new subscription terms for their apps in the Oculus store	
v37	Oculus Quest build 37.0	January 17, 2022		ability to control the order of apps instead of pinning only to the top of the App Library; Link Sharpening algorithm improved; Stationary Guardian support for Passthrough; ability to teleport to different designated areas in Home environment (requires hiding the Universal Menu); ability to resize app windows in VR workspace to different heights and widths, initially in Browser, Oculus TV, Files and select 2D multitasking apps; ability to change the distance, scale, and rotation of 2D app panels by switching between desktop and tablet modes; support for seeing the Apple Magic Keyboard in VR (experimental); send a link directly from Quest phone app to Quest headset (initially for Android); pinch gesture with hands to bring up a quick action menu; Explore page redesign; ability to adjust Touch controller thumbstick center dead zone, as well as the thumbstick range	

=== Meta Quest era (2022–2024) ===
Version	Build	PTC date	Release date	Notes	Features	Release notes
v38	Meta Quest build 38.0	February 25, 2022	March 7, 2022	First release under the Meta brand	highlighting of owned apps which support enhanced Multiplayer features; recently met players; MR Couch and Desk moved out of Experimental to Guardian settings; redesign of Settings page, including search bar in the Settings menu; tooltips in Quick Action Menu; Tracked Keyboards and BT settings moved from Experimental to Device settings; or Android)	
v39	Meta Quest build 39.0	March 22, 2022	April 11, 2022		addition of settings section to customize virtual workspace; move of all multitasking features from Experimental to main Settings menu, including: ability to use side-by-side app windows to additional 2D apps; switch between multiple windows to launch, focus, minimize, and close any open apps that support multitasking; sort notifications by time or by app in-VR; quickly unsubscribe or change notification settings for a VR or 2D app using Quest mobile app; send a link directly from Quest phone app to Quest headset (extended to iOS)	
v40	Meta Quest build 40.0	May 2, 2022	May 16, 2022		support for additional tracked keyboards and management of saved keyboards; support for 3DS credit cards for the Meta Quest app store in VR; lock individual apps on Quest headset using unlock pattern; transition to end-to-end encryption for all 1:1 communications in VR, including Messenger; Ability to adjust the left-right audio balance; Option to switch between stereo and mono audio; controller settings out of experimental status	
v41	Meta Quest build 41.0	June 2, 2022	June 14, 2022		early access to Meta Horizon Home; Oculus TV in Meta Horizon Home; parental supervision tools; Color Space setting	
v42	Meta Quest build 42.0	July 8, 2022	July 11, 2022		Oculus Move 2.0, including Move Achievements and Move Trends; notification of unread Messenger chats in app icon; Air Link out of experimental, including Connection benchmarking tool and full Windows 11 compatibility for Air Link; parental supervision option to disable social features; display contrast slider	
v43	Meta Quest build 43.0	July 21, 2022	August 8, 2022		no longer required to sign in using a Facebook account; renaming of Oculus profiles as Meta Horizon profiles; Meta Quest Guide	
v44	Meta Quest build 44.0	August 31, 2022	September 19, 2022		Advanced Camera Settings, enabled under Experimental Settings panel; allowing Parental Controls to block access to Developer Mode; allowing Parental Controls to lock multiple apps using a single PIN entry; filter and lock apps based on ratings categories	
v46	Meta Quest build 46.0		October 6, 2022	first to support Quest Pro	redesign of Privacy Settings; clear out personal and other popular searches; enabling Search to bring up previous searches first; quick access to three most recently used apps in Universal Menu bar; Fit Adjustment (Quest Pro only); Quest Store highlight of apps made for Quest Pro (Quest Pro only); redesign of Quest interface for Quest Pro (Quest Pro only); first to support color passthrough (Quest Pro only)	
v46	Meta Quest Pro build 46.0		October 6, 2022	first to support Quest Pro	redesign of Privacy Settings; clear out personal and other popular searches; enabling Search to bring up previous searches first; quick access to three most recently used apps in Universal Menu bar; Fit Adjustment (Quest Pro only); Quest Store highlight of apps made for Quest Pro (Quest Pro only); redesign of Quest interface for Quest Pro (Quest Pro only); first to support color passthrough (Quest Pro only)	
v47	Meta Quest build 47.0	November 16, 2022	November 28, 2022		Background audio playback (Quest Pro only); mixed reality capture (Quest Pro only); VR-captured media sync with Meta Quest mobile app; redesign of Quest mobile app device management screen to notify of need to charge; quick access to multiplayer session with friends from home screen in Quest mobile app; shareable wishlist; view and edit avatar in Horizon Home; pin and unpin apps from library to Universal Menu; accept follower request from invites; Meta Quest Touch Pro Controllers compatibility for Quest 2; Sharing panel renamed Camera; capture shortcut for Quest Touch controller	
v49	Meta Quest build 49.0	January 17, 2023	January 24, 2023		Family Center for parental supervision tools; Optional "Do not disturb" mode for full immersion; accessibility settings to the Meta Quest mobile app; 3DS (SCA) authentication step for checkout in mobile app for in-app purchases in VR; fourth app added to app history; active app indicator	
v50	Meta Quest build 50.0	February 10, 2023	February 21, 2023	support dropped for first-gen Oculus Quest	2D app multitasking for Quest 2; experimental Direct Touch; switch between tablet and desktop modes for VR menu viewing experience; text labels for Quick Settings; reduction of time for tracking to initialize in Touch Pro controllers	
v51	Meta Quest build 51.0	March 27, 2023	March 27, 2023 (de facto)		OS updated to Android 12L, enabling full performance; expanded access to local dimming; ability to stream/record video and audio over USB or WiFi; AVIF image compression; wireless debugging	
v53	Meta Quest build 53.0	April 18, 2023	April 27, 2023		Parental Supervision content filters for Meta Quest Browser; WIFI 6E support for Meta Quest Pro; Advanced camera settings moved from Experimental Settings to Camera tab; stereo audio for video recording; option to update apps during shutdown; manual setting of time zone and time; grouping of notifications from the same app; support for logging in to Twitch.tv	
v54	Meta Quest build 54.0	May 4, 2023	May 18, 2023		customization of Skybox View; improvements to Guardian settings and App library; Follow requests grouped together at top of notifications; Avatar mirror added to more environments; light theme moved to System menu; Boundary, Passthrough and Objects & Furniture settings combined into Physical Space; opt-in for more app notifications in VR	
v55	Meta Quest build 55.0	June 7, 2023	June 21, 2023		higher clock speeds for the CPU and GPU; passcode to unlock device (4-12 characters); Messenger app added to VR; Followed users online indicated in People tab; Redesign of Explore app, including Facebook/Instagram Reels, Avatars Store, Horizon Worlds, and Media content from Peacock, YouTube VR, Pluto TV and Xtadium; one-click access to avatar editing mirror; multi-touch gesture support for Quest Browser; support for hand-tracking interaction with notifications	
v56	Meta Quest build 56.0	July 10, 2023	July 24, 2023		Hand Tracking 2.2, including latency reduction; limited introduction of Facebook livestreaming; chat thread is automatically created with all the members invited to the call for Chats and Parties; system-level live captions in Meta Quest TV, Explore and Meta Quest Store in-headset; button swapping and remapping; automatic turn-on and software updates while charging; system-wide local dimming for Quest Pro	
v57	Meta Quest build 57.0	August 24, 2023	September 11, 2023		unsending image messages in VR and the Meta Quest mobile app; Horizon Feed, replacing Explore at startup; Meta Horizon group links for inviting friends; notification of boundary unavailability upon launch of an app; customization of avatar hair, eyebrows, and more using real-time editor in Home Environments; allowance to use multiple apps simultaneously in a near and far configuration; automatic opening of contacts list; option to use microphone audio when recording video; Removal of Meta Quest casting mobile camera feature	
v59	Meta Quest build 59.0	October 11, 2023	October 24, 2023	first to support Meta Quest 3	allowing users to send images, use Avatar stickers, or add reactions to messages in Chat; early access to YouTube Live Chat; Activities tab; integration of Family Center into the Meta Quest mobile app, allowing parents and teens to initiate invitations to supervision; availability of Remote Display for Quest 2 and 3; legs for avatars in Horizon Home; toggle for extended battery life (Quest 3); suggested boundary (for Quest 3); assisted space setup (for Quest 3)	
v60	Meta Quest build 60.0	November 14, 2023	December 4, 2023		three new Horizon Home environments; new profile design; higher clock speeds for Quest Pro's CPU and GPU when running MR applications; cloud computing capabilities to store boundaries, requiring opt-in to share point cloud data; passthrough while loading app (if enabled); integration of Google Safe Browsing in Meta Quest web browser; end-to-end encryption for cloud backup; phone notifications disabled	
v62	Meta Quest build 62.0	January 17, 2024	February 7, 2024		support for stereoscopic, 180-degree "spatial video" (up to 20 minutes long) as produced using the iPhone 15 Pro or iPhone 15 Pro Max for visionOS.; support for external gamepads; expansion of support for livestreaming to Facebook for all users; YouTube chats visible in-headset while public livestreaming; unavailable for private or unlisted livestreams; support for a single pinch gesture to open/hide the Universal Menu or long-press gesture to recenter the display; Safety Center; support for up to 15 total saved spaces in Space Setup; ability to recall previous spaces without scanning; app continuity when multitasking; improved microphone quality, including audio/video synchronization, speech clarity	
v63	Meta Quest build 63.0	February 15, 2024	March 5, 2024		Quest Cash, new payment and credit-sharing method for games and other purchases from the Quest Store; ability to use Meta Quest 2 or Quest Pro headset while lying down (experimental)	
v64	Meta Quest build 64.0	March 27, 2024	April 8, 2024		"lying down" mode (experimental); external mic support (experimental, Quest 3 only); continued livestreaming while headset is taken off; direct joining of friends in Horizon Worlds from the People app on the Universal Menu; Passthrough improvements: resolution and image quality; automatic detection and labeling of objects within mesh during Space Setup (undocumented, experimental, optional); simultaneous tracking of hands and Touch Pro/Touch Plus controllers in the same space (undocumented, experimental, optional)	

=== Horizon OS era (2024-2026) ===
Version	Build	PTC date	Release date	Notes	Features	Release notes
v65	Meta Quest build 65.0	April 17, 2024	April 30, 2024	First release following rebrand as Horizon OS.	upload panoramic photos or spatial video to headset via Quest mobile app (supports IOS 17 or later); passthrough environment for some system menus and prompts, including lockscreen and power-off menu; fewer interruptions from hand tracking when using a physical keyboard or mouse with headset; Local multiplayer and boundary recall with Meta Virtual Positioning System; Travel Mode for airplane flights (experimental, optional, available only for Quest 2 and 3)	
v66	Meta Quest build 66.0	May 15, 2024	June 3, 2024		improvements to passthrough, including reductions in warping; adjustments to exposure, colors, and contrast; improvements to background audio for 2D apps, including minimizing apps without automatically pausing playback; media controller moved out of notifications into a Media Control Bar under the universal menu to control media playback; wrist buttons for clicking Meta and Menu icons (experimental); ability to hide any app (installed or uninstalled) downloaded from the Quest Store; teens and children ages 10-12 who are supervised by the same parent or guardian are automatically able to see each other in the Family Center (starting June 27); Sleep Mode added to power-off menu; Space Setup automatic identification and marking of furniture (windows, doors, tables, couches, storage, screens, and beds, with additional furniture types supported over time) (documented, optional)	
v67	Meta Quest build 67.0	June 24, 2024	July 8, 2024		New Window Layout (experimental): expanded maximum number of open windows from three to six in window layout (up to three docked and three attached); ability to grab and detach windows to position and resize them freely; button to temporarily hide other windows in immersive view; ability to take any window fullscreen, thus replacing other windows and replacing the dock with simplified control bar with buttons for toggling curving, passthrough background, and brightness of background.; replaces explicit Close View and Far View modes; new creator videos in Horizon Feed; ability to use swipe typing to enter text when using headset; improvements to eye tracking recalibration (Quest Pro only); select different durations for Do Not Disturb; Wi-Fi QR code scanner (Quest 3 only); open Quest TV or use File Viewer to watch immersive videos without quitting current immersive app	
v68	Meta Quest build 68.0	July 15, 2024	July 29, 2024		Meta Quest mobile app renamed as Meta Horizon app; Light mode added to Horizon mobile app; ability to start or join audio calls between the mobile app and Meta Quest headsets; Integration of Meta AI with Vision on Quest 3 and Meta AI audio-only on Quest 2 (experimental); replaces older on-device voice assistant (set for August 2024 release); reduced performance latency on Quest 3; support for Content Adaptive Brightness Control in Quest 3 (experimental); account management and communication updates in Safety Center; updates for the virtual keyboard; new Layout app for aligning and measuring real-world objects in physical space; new Download and All tabs in Library; management of cloud backups; ability to pair controller to headset while in-headset; audio alert for low battery; ability control the audio level balance between microphone and game audio when recording, live streaming, or casting; increased screenshot resolution in Quest 3 from 1440x1440 to 2160x2160	
v69	Meta Quest build 69.0	August 9, 2024	September 5, 2024		App Lab apps fully merged into renamed Horizon Store (formerly Quest Store) as of August 23; “Hey Meta” wake word for Meta AI; v67 New Window Layout moved to default; spatial audio from windows; ability to completely remove unwanted apps and worlds, including leftover apps already uninstalled; quick pairing of Bluetooth peripherals when they are in pairing mode and near the headset; ability to keep the universal menu and up to three windows open during immersive experiences; Content-adaptive backlight control; automatic placing of user into a stationary boundary when user visits Horizon Home; Head tracked cursor interaction improvements for staying hidden when not wanted; ability to view the last 7 days of sensitive permission access by installed apps; Unified control of privacy across Meta Quest and Horizon Worlds; Control visibility and status from the social tab; support for tracked styluses; Oceanarium environment for Horizon Home; v69 required to support Horizon Worlds, Horizon Workrooms, co-presence and other Meta Horizon social experiences	
v71	Meta Quest build 71.0	September 30, 2024	November 4, 2024	First update after release of Meta Quest 3S	redesign of Dark and Light Themes; redesign of control bar location; redesign of Settings menu; Travel Mode extended to trains; Link feature enabled by default; Remote Desktop in Quick Settings; ability to use desktop remotely through the Meta Quest Link app on PC; in-headset pairing of third-party styluses; in-headset controller pairing; view app permissions while in use; higher-quality casting from headset to PC; new Calendar app, with Google and Outlook Calendars integration, support for subscribed Meta Horizon Worlds events or Workrooms meetings; ability to share and play back spatial video within Horizon Chat in-headset and mobile; Volume Mixer, with separate Call Volume and App & Media Volume; support for content utilizing 3 degrees of freedom (DoF) head tracking through Dolby Atmos and Dolby Digital Surround, with Atmos being available for Browser; Audio to Expression: machine perception and AI capability deriving facial motion and lip sync signals from microphone input, providing upper face movements including upper cheeks, eyelids, and eyebrows for avatars. Replaces OVRLipsync SDK.; improvements for Passthrough and Space Setup	
v72	Meta Quest build 72.0	November 18, 2024	December 9, 2024		in-headset Gallery app to view, manage and share; Hand-tracking updates; stabilization and visual fixes for cursor; responsiveness and stability of drag-and-drop interactions; Remote desktop access with Windows 11 PCs; updates to in-headset Facebook app to view Stories; Instagram direct messaging; Travel Mode indicator; generalized passthrough cutout access for physical keyboards; improvements for linking from windows; automatic stationary boundary when booting into VR home; live captions in People app during calls	
v72	Meta Quest build 72.0 for Quest 2	January 9, 2025		Released for Quest 2	Update for Quest 2 users who encountered a bug which rendered their devices inoperable after updated to v72.	
v72	Meta XR Core SDK 72.0		January 23, 2025		Dynamic Object Tracking API (public release); Audio To Expressions Viseme Support	
v74	Meta Quest build 74.0	January 24, 2025	February 18, 2025	builds renamed as Horizon	Web shortcuts in Library, System menu to Quest Link, DisplayPort Out to external monitors, Improved wireless casting, Minimized 2D Apps Now Shown; Seamless multitasking; Scan multiple rooms in one scanning session, while saving each room separately; Travel detection; Update to Android Night Display for "color balance, white point and warmth"; Spatial audio enabled for calling apps; New dialog for when an app crashes; Improvement for transition experience from home to an immersive app; Real-time algorithm to provide better sounding balance between the microphone and game audio; Secondary users able to connect to the Meta Horizon mobile app	
v74	Meta XR Core SDK 74.0		March 14, 2025		improved Audio to Expression; thumb microgestures; Passthrough Camera API (PCA, public experimental)	
v74	Meta Quest build 74.1020		March 3, 2025		bug fixes and improvements	
v74	Meta Quest build 74.1021		March 31, 2025		bug fixes and improvements; travel mode toggle added to settings	
v76	Meta Quest build 76.0	March 21, 2025	April 8, 2025		avatar selfie camera for video calls; OS update to Android 14; shareable windows; New user interface; Live Captions for any app; Horizon Worlds uninstallable; headset-unique advertising ID	
v76	Meta Quest build 76.1023		April 16, 2025		bug fixes; improvements	
v76	Meta Quest build 76.1024		May 1, 2025		bug fixes; improvements	
v76	Meta Quest build 76.1025		May 5, 2025		Light display theme settings improvements; bug fixes	
v76	Meta Quest build 76.1026		May 19, 2025		bug fixes; improvements; five new lock settings into ITAP and on-headset allowing admins to choose to lock Software updates, Quest Link, Virtual Keyboard, Passthrough, and Time settings sections on ITAP	
v76	Meta Quest build 76.1027		June 2, 2025		bug fixes; improvements; Improved discoverability of Display Theme Settings	
v77	Meta Quest build 77.0	April 29, 2025	May 19, 2025		test of Navigator UI; test of 3D photos on select user's Instagram feeds; merger of Meta Quest Link, casting, and remote desktop into single Horizon for PC app; toggle spatial audio access for apps and panels; select single window which follows the user around; support for Bluetooth devices that support Low Energy (LE) audio (experimental); Text to Speech (accessible on certain apps); changes to name tag customization options and removal of name tag frames; new button shortcut for activation of Meta AI	
v77	Meta Quest build v77.1028		June 16, 2025		improvements and bug fixes	
v78	Meta Quest build 78.0	June 5, 2025	June 16, 2025		Dolby ATMOS offered system-wide for all apps which support it; avatar self-view camera in browser; updates to accessibility settings; Horizon Mobile app update for avatars (released June 30): 16 premade body physique types, with customization options for hips, waist, shoulders, arms and stomach; 16 premade face shape types, with customization for face width, cheek fullness, jaw size, chin size, face depth, and maturity; AI-assisted text prompts for selecting from premade library avatar clothing, replacing generation of custom textures for virtual t-shirts; option to toggle between regular avatar editor and AI assist	
v79	Meta Quest build 79.0	June 25, 2025	July 21, 2025		adaptive lighting, enabling precise tuning of VR panels to blend with passthrough to improve perceptual comfort; Files App: search for files by name, previewing PDF files and opening files with third party apps	
v81	Meta Quest build 81.0	August 25, 2025	October 6, 2025		Immersive Home visual refresh, incompatible with prior home environments; Horizon Central visual refresh, including clothes store, ability to host 120+ users, faster travel; Horizon Arena: live event space; App Pinning: ability to pin favorite windowed apps directly in Passthrough; pin windows to specific locations in MR and VR Home through the control bar pin; ability to place objects in Passthrough which are accessible from the menu button on the left controller, including Avatar Mirror; Universal Menu made default navigation, with Navigator remaining optional; accuracy improvements for Meta AI; Passthrough can now be used in Home with tracking or guardian turned off; Remote Desktop pairing with Mixed Reality Link now available by default; ability to clear Immersive Full Passthrough to see physical surroundings and switch back; QuickPlay: launch an application and begin gameplay before all assets have been downloaded; World Safety System: prompts users to use an existing nearby boundary or create a new one; concurrent open windows increased to 12; ability to create shareable links for the photos and videos captured in Meta Quest; visual refresh of user switcher screen, including ability to add new accounts directly from this screen; "rescale" (continuously enlarge applications without increasing the pixel allocation) and "ratio locking" (lock the aspect ratios of application displays).	
v83	Meta Quest build 83.0	October 27, 2025	November 24, 2025		login into certain websites in Quest Browser via Meta Horizon mobile app; representation of more complex architectural elements like multi-height floors, slanted ceilings, and inner walls in Space Setup; Temporal Dimming, gradually dims display brightness during each session; Boundary settings simplification, joining boundary sensitivity and controller speed together as single setting slider; System Positional TimeWarp (SysPTW) from Depth-From-Stereo, real-time scene depth to reduce visual shudder and lag when apps drop frames; Meta Quest Link App renamed Meta Horizon Link App; updates to Navigator beta (PTC only): redesign of Navigator overlay and Universal Menu; direct Library links to Horizon Worlds experiences	
v85	Meta Quest build 85.0	January 7, 2026	January 26, 2026		sunset of Horizon Feed; gradual rollout of Navigator windowing system and Universal Menu; redesign of Ongoing Activities bar; ability to temporarily hide hand tracking; Surface Keyboard and Touchpad (Experimental); Action Button Customization on Meta Quest 3S; improvements to malware scanning; privacy indicator; Browser window pre-anchored on virtual Home wall; Voice Control to enable control of 2D windows using voice commands and head movements; passkey login enabled	

=== Horizon OS 2 era (2026-present) ===
Version	Build	PTC date	Release date	Notes	Features	Release notes
2.1	Horizon OS 2.1	February 9, 2026	February 23, 2026	versioning restarted to Horizon OS 2.	removal of Worlds from the system bar while remaining accessible from the Library; battery level and Wi-Fi status indicators placed next to the clock in Navigator; Apps, windows, and panels now automatically snap and align to nearby walls; Windows smoothly rescale in real time based on proximity; Xbox games accessible from search on Meta Quest; option to share only specific photos and videos with each app; On-device voice dictation, regardless of internet connection	
2.3	Horizon OS 2.3	March 23, 2026	April 13, 2026		Navigator windowing system rolled out to all users; ability to switch between light and dark system themes without restarting device; Automatic App Offload updated with ability to choose which apps to keep installed regardless of recent use; fewer Passthrough dialog interruptions; smoother moving and grabbing of panels	
2.4	Horizon OS 2.4	May 4, 2026	May 18, 2026		Navigator updated with ability to rearrange apps to put favorites first, or create folders to group apps together; Apps automatically restore previous session if they close unexpectedly; ability to move through virtual Home without controllers using hand gestures	
2.5	Horizon OS 2.5	June 1, 2026	June 22, 2026		photos and videos in Gallery open in 3D automatically; ability to upload photos to headset from the Horizon app to view in 3D; new default scenery "Valley" for VR Home; Meta AI made available on all Quest devices (opt-in, US and Canada only)	
2.6	Horizon OS 2.6	July 6, 2026	July 20, 2026		viewing perspective in VR Home follows user's real head height	
2.7	Horizon OS 2.7	July 27, 2026	August 17, 2026		adjust content size across user's apps and operating system; ability to use Meta Quest Touch controllers to emulate an XBOX gamepad (compatible with XBOX and Steam Link); Remote Desktop renamed Virtual Display	
2.9	Horizon OS 2.9	September 28, 2026	October 19, 2026		Through a new Window manager, Windows are now launched spatially, making it easier to drag and position apps; Surface Keyboard and Touchpad works in fully virtual environments as well as passthrough; built-in QR code scanner; ability to troubleshoot unresponsive Touch controllers from within the headset; classic VR Home environments; Boundary setup recovery; find and change settings directly via search; notification to switch between controllers and hand tracking when an app requires the user to change input methods	
2.10	Horizon OS 2.10	October 26, 2026	November 9, 2026		Theater mode to watch cinema-scale screen inside a theater environment, hiding other windows when in theater mode; Avatar video calls in Chats; simplified Navigator (test)	
