= Android Central =

Technology journalism website

- Website type: Technology journalism
- Founded: September 2008
- Headquarters: New York City, United States, Canada
- Country of origin: United States
- Founders: Dieter Bohn and Casey Chan
- Editor: Shruti Shekar
- CEO: Kevin Li Ying (as of 31 March 2025)
- Managing director: Paul Newman
- General manager: Jeremy Kaplan
- Industry: Technology journalism
- Parent: Future plc
- Website: www.androidcentral.com
- Commercial: Yes
- Current status: Active

Android Central is a technology journalism website based in the United States, Canada, and the United Kingdom that covers the Android operating system. It publishes news, reviews of products and services, and editorials. Android Central also covers Google, Android TV and streaming, Wear OS, Chrome OS, Gemini, and Android XR and VR devices in the MetaQuest range. According to its archive, the site publishes between 280 and 450 articles a month, on average, and it received 4.7 million visitors in January 2025, according to SimilarWeb.

In late September 2026, Android Central laid off its staff, but its parent firm Future plc insisted that the blog will continue to publish stories.

== History ==
Smartphone Experts – later called Mobile Nations – launched Android Central in September 2008 under the guidance of Dieter Bohn, later a founding editor of The Verge.

The first article published on the site was on 25 September 2008, by Casey Chan, titled "T-Mobile G1 doesn't have a 3.5mm headphone jack."

The site has published numerous exclusives and scoops since its founding, including a first look at the 2013 Nexus 7 tablet and the almost-never-released HTC Merge.

In 2019, Android Central’s parent company, Mobile Nations, was acquired by Future plc for $60 million.

== Executives ==
Canadian journalist Shruti Shekar took over as editor-in-chief of Android Central in September 2023, succeeding Jeramy Johnson. Shekar frequently appears on the Canadian network CBC as a guest expert on technology news.
