= Samsung Galaxy Z Flip 5 =

2023 foldable smartphone by Samsung Electronics

- Samsung Galaxy Z Flip 5
- Also known as: Samsung Galaxy Flip 5 (in certain European countries)
- Brand: Samsung
- Manufacturer: Samsung Electronics
- Type: Foldable smartphone
- Series: Galaxy Z
- Family: Samsung Galaxy
- First released: August 11, 2023; 3 years ago
- Availability by region: August 11, 2023; 3 years ago
- Predecessor: Samsung Galaxy Z Flip 4
- Successor: Samsung Galaxy Z Flip 6 Samsung Galaxy Z Flip 7 FE
- Related: Samsung Galaxy S23; Samsung Galaxy Z Fold 5
- Compatible networks: GSM / CDMA / HSPA / EVDO / LTE / 5G
- Form factor: Foldable slate
- Colors: Mint, Graphite, Cream, Lavender, Gray, Blue, Green, Yellow
- Dimensions: Unfolded: 165.1 mm (6.50 in) H 71.9 mm (2.83 in) W 6.9 mm (0.27 in) D Folded: 85.1 mm (3.35 in) H 71.9 mm (2.83 in) W 15.1 mm (0.59 in) D
- Operating system: Original: Android 13 with One UI 5.1.1; Current: Android 17 with One UI 9.0
- System-on-chip: Qualcomm Snapdragon 8 Gen 2 for Galaxy
- CPU: Octa-core (1x3.36 GHz Cortex-X3 & 2x2.8 GHz Cortex-A715 & 2x2.8 GHz Cortex-A710 & 3x2.0 GHz Cortex-A510)
- GPU: Adreno 740
- Memory: 8 GB RAM
- Storage: 256 and 512 GB UFS 4.0
- SIM: Nano-SIM and eSIM
- Battery: Li-Ion 3,700 mAh
- Charging: Fast wired charging up to 25W; Fast wireless charging up to 15W; Reverse wireless charging up to 4.5W
- Rear camera: 12 MP, f/1.8, 24mm (wide), 1/1.76", 1.8μm, Dual Pixel PDAF, OIS, Samsung S5K2LD sensor 12 MP, f/2.2, 123° (ultrawide), 1.12μm, Sony IMX258 sensor LED flash, HDR, panorama 4K@30/60fps, 1080p@60/240fps, 720p@960fps, HDR10+
- Front camera: 10 MP, f/2.2, 26mm (wide), 1.22μm, Samsung S5K3J1 sensor 4K@30fps, HDR
- Display: 6.7 in (170 mm); 1080 x 2640 pixels (~426 ppi density); Foldable Dynamic AMOLED 2X, 120Hz refresh rate, HDR10+, 1200 nits (peak)
- External display: 3.4 in (86 mm); 720 x 748 pixels (Gorilla Glass Victus2), 305 ppi Super AMOLED
- Sound: Stereo speakers
- Connectivity: Wi-Fi 802.11 a/b/g/n/ac/6, tri-band, Wi-Fi Direct; Bluetooth 5.3, A2DP, LE
- Data inputs: Multi-touch screen; USB Type-C 2.0; Fingerprint scanner; Accelerometer; Gyroscope; Proximity sensor; Compass; Barometer
- Water resistance: IPX8 water resistant (up to 1.5m for 30 min)
- Model: International models: SM-F731x (last letter varies by carrier and international models); Japanese models: SCG23 (au); SC-54D (NTT Docomo)
- Website: www.samsung.com/us/smartphones/galaxy-z-flip5/

The Samsung Galaxy Z Flip 5 (stylized as Samsung Galaxy Z Flip5, sold as Samsung Galaxy Flip 5 in certain territories) is a clamshell-styled foldable smartphone by Samsung Electronics, first released on August 11, 2023. It marked the fourth-generation of the Galaxy Z foldable line, specifically the flip phone branch, succeeding the Samsung Galaxy Z Flip 4. Originally shipping with the Android 13 operating system, it is upgradable to Android 17 with One UI 9.0.

While its predecessor provided mainly internal improvements over the Z Flip 3, the Z Flip 5 on the other hand had a major exterior redesign with a new cover screen dubbed "Flex Window", measuring 3.4-inches big. Samsung also complemented it with further functionalities using this cover screen such as a full keyboard for text replies. The phone's mechanism was renewed with a teardrop-style screen folding mechanism, effectively ridding of the gap near the hinge on the previous mechanism design. While it uses the same battery as its predecessor, the Samsung Galaxy Flip 5 has higher battery life because of its more efficient processor.

== History ==
The phone was announced on July 26, 2023, alongside the Galaxy Z Fold 5, Galaxy Tab S9 and Galaxy Watch 6. Its unveiling marked the first time that the Galaxy Unpacked event was held in the company's home country of South Korea.

== Design ==
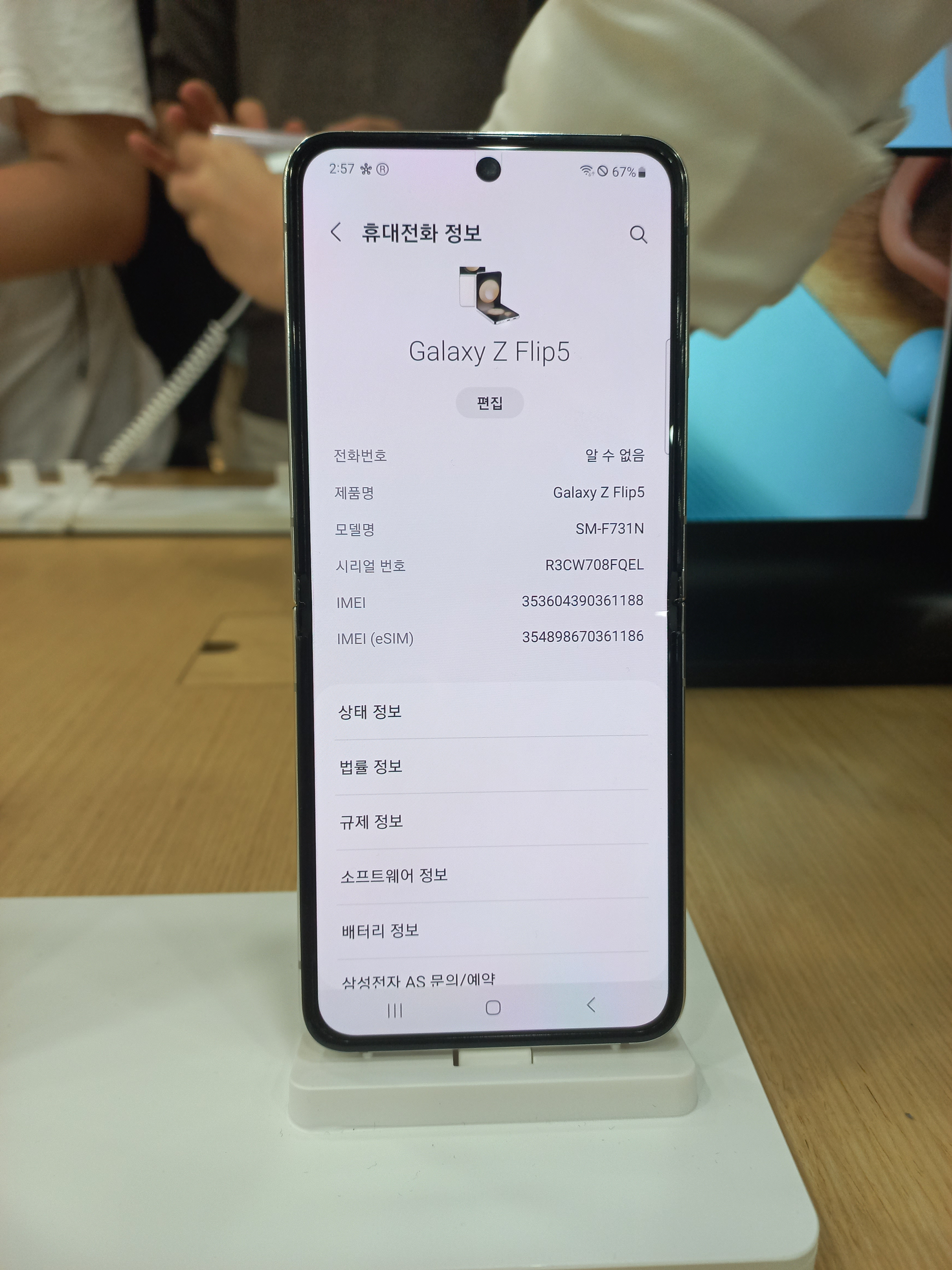
Samsung Galaxy Z Flip 5 unfolded

The device features a clamshell-style foldable design with a redesigned hinge that allows the device to close completely flat, reducing the visible gap when folded. The exterior is constructed with an Armor Aluminum frame and protected by Gorilla Glass Victus 2 on both the cover screen and back panel. The device also carries an IPX8 rating for water resistance.

It is available in multiple color options, including several online-exclusive variants:

Model	Galaxy Z Flip 5
Base colors	Graphite; Lavender; Mint; Cream
Online exclusive colors	Gray; Blue; Green; Yellow

== Specifications ==
=== Display ===
The Galaxy Z Flip 5 features a 6.7‑inch Dynamic AMOLED 2X main display with a resolution of 2640 × 1080 pixels (21:9 aspect ratio) and a pixel density of approximately 425 ppi. It supports a variable refresh rate from 1 to 120 Hz, enabling adaptive performance based on content type. The display also supports HDR10+ and is protected by Ultra Thin Glass (UTG).

==== Cover Display and FlexMode ====
For the first time in the Galaxy Z Flip series, the device's cover screen now features a 3.4-inch Super AMOLED display with a folder-like shape, upgraded from the rectangular-shaped 1.9-inch found on its predecessor, the Galaxy Z Flip 4. The screen is protected by Gorilla Glass Victus 2.

Alongside the upgraded cover screen, it also introduced several improvements optimized for the new cover screen. These include Flex Mode (which enables the device to stay partially folded at various stable angles, and the app's user interface automatically adjusts when supported), Flex Cam (enhancing camera functionality for hands-free use, such as when the device is partially folded and placed on a flat surface to take selfies or record videos), and support for widgets (and certain apps) on cover screen without unfolding.

=== Performance ===
The device is equipped with Qualcomm Snapdragon 8 Gen 2 for Galaxy, which was first used on the Galaxy S23 series and also on the Galaxy Tab S9 series. The device is only sold in 8 GB of RAM, and storage options either in 256 GB or 512 GB (both with UFS 4.0), being the first Z Flip device to drop the 128 GB option (which was last offered on the Galaxy Z Flip 4).

=== Battery ===
Just like its predecessor, it has a 3,700 mAh dual-cell battery. It also supports 25W fast wired charging and 15W wireless charging.

=== Camera ===
Also similar to its predecessor, it inherited the same dual camera setup, consisting of 12 MP wide angle sensor and a 12 MP ultra-wide camera sensor. Camera features include LED flash, HDR, and panorama. On the front, the main display includes a 10 MP front-facing selfie camera.

The device supports camera functionality through the external cover display. Using the Flex Window interface, users can preview shots, take selfies with the rear camera, and access selected camera features without opening the device. The Flex Mode enables hands-free shooting by positioning the phone at different angles.

== Software ==
The Galaxy Z Flip 5 was released with Android 13 and One UI 5.1.1. The software includes features designed for foldable use cases, such as Flex Mode support and cover screen interactions through the Flex Window interface. Alongside the Galaxy Z Fold 5, Galaxy S23 and Galaxy Tab S9 series, they are the last Samsung flagships to support 32-bit applications and are set to receive 4 OS upgrades and 5 years of security updates (support ending within 2028). It also marks the last time these devices will receive this level of support, as its successors all had 7 years of support.

	Pre-installed OS	OS Upgrades history				End of support
	Pre-installed OS	1st	2nd	3rd	4th	End of support
Z Flip 5	Android 13 (One UI 5.1.1)	Android 14 (One UI 6.0); November 2023 (One UI 6.1); March 2024 (One UI 6.1.1); September 2024	Android 15 (One UI 7.0); April 2025	Android 16 (One UI 8.0); September 2025 (One UI 8.5); May 2026	Android 17 (One UI 9.0); October 2026	Expected within 2028

== See also ==
- Samsung Galaxy Z series
- Samsung Galaxy Z Fold 5

Preceded by Samsung Galaxy Z Flip 4	Samsung Galaxy Z Flip 5; 2023	Succeeded by Samsung Galaxy Z Flip 6
