= Samsung Galaxy Z Flip 6 =

2024 foldable smartphone by Samsung Electronics

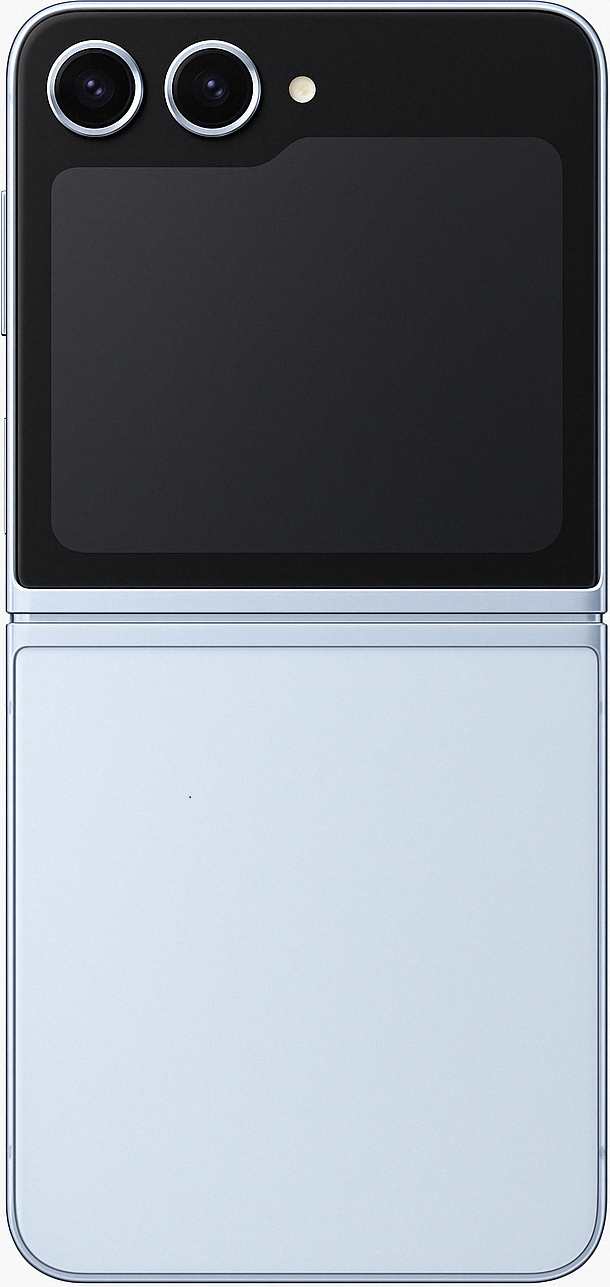
- Samsung Galaxy Z Flip6 back view in Blue
- Also known as: Samsung Galaxy Flip 6 (in certain European countries)
- Brand: Samsung
- Manufacturer: Samsung Electronics
- Type: Foldable smartphone
- Series: Galaxy Z
- Family: Samsung Galaxy
- First released: July 31, 2024; 2 years ago
- Availability by region: July 31, 2024; 2 years ago
- Discontinued: July 9, 2025; 16 months ago
- Predecessor: Samsung Galaxy Z Flip 5
- Successor: Samsung Galaxy Z Flip 7
- Related: Samsung Galaxy S24; Samsung Galaxy Z Fold 6 Samsung Galaxy Z Flip 7 FE
- Compatible networks: GSM / CDMA / HSPA / EVDO / LTE / 5G
- Form factor: Foldable slate
- Colors: Yellow, Silver Shadow, Mint, Blue, Black, White, Peach
- Operating system: Original: Android 14 with One UI 6.1.1; Current: Android 17 with One UI 9.0
- System-on-chip: Qualcomm Snapdragon 8 Gen 3 (4 nm)
- CPU: Octa-core (1×3.3 GHz Cortex-X4 & 3×3.2 GHz Cortex-A720 & 2×3.0 GHz Cortex-A720 & 2×2.3 GHz Cortex-A520)
- GPU: Adreno 750
- Modem: Snapdragon X75 5G
- Memory: 12 GB LPDDR5X
- Storage: 256 or 512 GB UFS 4.0
- SIM: Nano-SIM and multi eSIM
- Battery: 4000 mAh
- Charging: 25W Super fast charging 15W Fast wireless charging 4.5W Reverse wireless charging
- Rear camera: 50 MP, f/1.8, 23 mm (wide), 1.0 μm, dual pixel PDAF, OIS; 12 MP, f/2.2, 123° (ultrawide), 1.12 μm LED flash, HDR, panorama 4K@30/60fps, 1080p@60/120/240fps, 720p@960fps, HDR10+
- Front camera: 10 MP, f/2.2, 23 mm (wide), 1.22 μm HDR; 4K@60fps
- Display: Foldable Dynamic LTPO AMOLED 2X, 120Hz, HDR10+, 2600 nits (peak), 6.7 inches (~85.5% screen-to-body ratio), 1080 × 2640 pixels (~426 ppi density)
- External display: Super AMOLED, 2600 nits (peak), 3.4 inches, 720 × 748 pixels (Gorilla Glass Victus 2), 306 ppi
- Sound: Stereo speakers with 32-bit/384kHz audio
- Connectivity: Wi-Fi 802.11 a/b/g/n/ac/6e, tri-band, Wi-Fi Direct; Bluetooth 5.3, A2DP, LE; GPS, GALILEO, GLONASS, BDS, QZSS; USB Type-C 3.2, OTG
- Data inputs: Fingerprint (side-mounted); Accelerometer; Gyro; Proximity; Compass; Barometer
- Water resistance: IP48 (up to 1.5m for 30 minutes)
- Made in: Vietnam

The Samsung Galaxy Z Flip 6 (stylized as Samsung Galaxy Z Flip6) is a clamshell-styled foldable smartphone running on Android, developed and marketed by Samsung Electronics. Officially announced on July 10, 2024, at the Samsung's Galaxy Unpacked event in Paris, France, alongside the Galaxy Z Fold 6, the Galaxy Watch 7, the Galaxy Buds 3 series, and the Galaxy Ring. It is the successor to the Galaxy Z Flip 5 and became available on July 31, 2024.

The fifth-generation Z Flip model, Samsung swapped the rounded and glossy edges of the Galaxy Z Flip 5 for flat and matte rails on the Galaxy Z Flip 6. A new cooling system was designed for it to reduce thermal throttling while RAM was upgraded to 12GB (up from 8GB), a larger battery (4,000 mAh), and an upgraded camera that, for the first time on a Z Flip phone, matched that of the concurrent Galaxy flagship, in this case the S24. On July 9, 2025, the Galaxy Z Flip 6 was succeeded by the Galaxy Z Flip 7 and its FE-based model.

== Design ==
Compared to its predecessor (the Galaxy Z Flip 5), the Galaxy Z Flip 6 features a more squared-off frame design. Its camera rings are color-matched to the device’s body. The frame is constructed from matte aluminum, compared to the polished frame on the Z Flip 5. The device holds an IP48 rating, making it the first foldable smartphone with certified dust protection. The cover screen and back panel are protected by Corning Gorilla Glass Victus 2, while the inner display uses ultra-thin glass (UTG).

The cover screen now supports resizable widgets, allowing multiple widgets to be displayed on a single page. Internally, a cooling system has been added to improve thermal management capabilities. The device's clamshell design also enables Flex Mode, which supports split-screen interactions when partially folded.

The device is available in seven colors: Blue, Silver Shadow, Mint, Yellow, Crafted Black, White, and Peach. Crafted Black, White, and Peach are online-exclusive variants, with Crafted black featuring a carbon fiber pattern finish.

Model	Galaxy Z Flip 6
Base colors	Silver Shadow; Blue; Mint; Yellow
Online exclusive colors	Crafted Black; White; Peach

== Specifications ==
=== Display ===
The Galaxy Z Flip 6 features a 6.7‑inch Dynamic AMOLED 2X main display with a resolution of 2640 × 1080 pixels (21:9 aspect ratio) and a pixel density of approximately 426 ppi. It supports a variable refresh rate from 1 to 120 Hz, enabling adaptive performance based on content type. The display also supports HDR10+ and is protected by Ultra Thin Glass (UTG).

==== Cover Display and FlexMode ====
The device features a 3.4-inch Super AMOLED cover display with a folder-like shape screen, similar to the Galaxy Z Flip 5. The screen is protected by Gorilla Glass Victus 2.

===== Flex Mode =====
Flex Mode enables the device to stay partially folded at various stable angles, typically between 75 and 115 degrees. When activated, supported apps automatically adjust their interface—often displaying content on the upper half and controls or additional features on the lower half of the screen. This configuration allows users to interact with media or multitask without fully unfolding the device.

===== Flex Cam =====
Flex Cam builds on Flex Mode by enhancing camera functionality for hands-free use. When the device is partially folded and positioned at a stable angle—such as on a table or shelf—users can take selfies, group shots, or record videos without manually holding the phone. Example use cases include static camera setups for video recording or remote communication. Additional features include automatic framing to maintain subject alignment, voice-activated capture for touch-free operation, and live camera previews via the cover display.

===== Cover screen features =====
The cover screen supports interactive widgets, quick reply options, and selfie previews utilizing the rear camera. Multiple widgets can now be displayed simultaneously on a single page, allowing access to functions without requiring the device to be unfolded.

=== Performance ===
The device is equipped with the Qualcomm Snapdragon 8 Gen 3 for Galaxy processor, first used on the Galaxy S24. The device includes 12 GB of RAM (marking the first Galaxy Z Flip phone to do so) and is available with either 256 GB or 512 GB of internal storage. It does not support microSD card expansion.

=== Battery ===
It contains two lithium-polymer batteries for a total capacity of 4,000 mAh. It supports wired charging up to 25 W and wireless charging up to 15 W.

=== Camera ===
It features two rear cameras: a 50 MP wide-angle lens (upgraded from the 12 MP on the predecessor) and a 12 MP ultra-wide-angle lens. Additionally, there is a 10 MP front-facing camera on the internal display.

=== Software ===
The device is pre-installed with Android 14 (and One UI 6.1.1), and software enhancements designed for foldable devices, along with support for Galaxy AI features. It is the first Galaxy Z Flip device to have 7 generations of Android OS updates and 7 years of security updates.

	Pre-installed OS	OS Upgrades history							End of support
	Pre-installed OS	1st	2nd	3rd	4th	5th	6th	7th	End of support
Z Flip 6	Android 14 (One UI 6.1.1)	Android 15 (One UI 7.0); April 2025	Android 16 (One UI 8.0); September 2025 (One UI 8.5); May 2026	Android 17 (One UI 9.0); October 2026					Within 2031

=== Galaxy AI ===
Key AI features include:

- Interpreter: Real-time translations appear simultaneously on main and cover screens, ideal for multilingual conversations without opening the phone.
- Chat Assist: Smart reply suggestions appear on the cover screen, enabling messaging without unfolding the device.

== See also ==
- Samsung Galaxy Z series
- Samsung Galaxy Z Fold 6

Preceded by Samsung Galaxy Z Flip 5	Samsung Galaxy Z Flip 6; 2024	Succeeded by Samsung Galaxy Z Flip 7
