= Foldable phone =

Foldable phone may refer to:

- Flip phone, a cell phone that uses clamshell design
- Foldable smartphone, a smartphone with a foldable form factor
