= Samsung Galaxy Z TriFold =

2025 tri-folding smartphone by Samsung Electronics

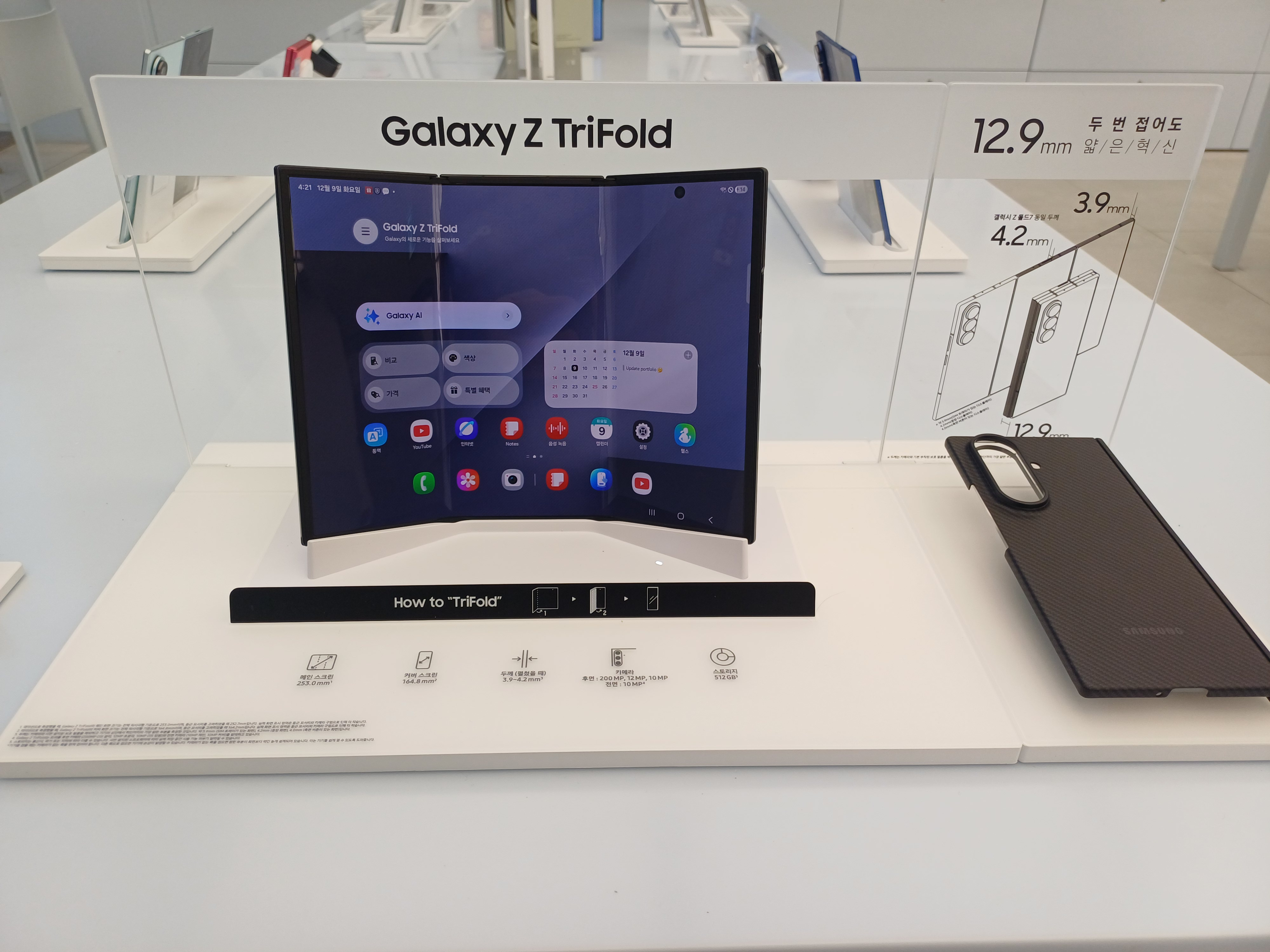
- Samsung Galaxy Z TriFold at a Samsung Store, showing the main screen
- Brand: Samsung
- Manufacturer: Samsung Electronics
- Type: Tri-foldable smartphone
- Series: Galaxy Z
- Family: Samsung Galaxy
- First released: December 1, 2025; 11 months ago
- Availability by region: December 12, 2025; 10 months ago (South Korea); December 19, 2025; 10 months ago (Singapore & U.A.E.); December 22, 2025; 10 months ago (Taiwan); January 30, 2026; 9 months ago (United States)
- Discontinued: March 2026; 8 months ago (U.A.E. & Taiwan); March 17, 2026; 7 months ago (South Korea & Singapore); April 10, 2026; 7 months ago (United States)
- Related: Samsung Galaxy S25; Samsung Galaxy Z Fold 7 Samsung Galaxy Z Flip 7 Samsung Galaxy Z Flip 7 FE
- Compatible networks: 2G / 3G / 4G / 5G
- Form factor: Foldable (tri-fold)
- Dimensions: Unfolded: 159.2 x 214.1 x 3.9-4.2 mm Folded: 159.2 x 75 x 12.9 mm
- Weight: 309 g (10.90 oz)
- Operating system: Original: Android 16 with One UI 8 Current: Android 17 with One UI 9
- System-on-chip: Qualcomm SM8750-AC Snapdragon 8 Elite (3 nm)
- CPU: Octa-core (2x4.47 GHz Oryon V2 Phoenix L + 6x3.53 GHz Oryon V2 Phoenix M)
- GPU: Adreno 830 (1200 MHz)
- Memory: 16GB
- Storage: 512GB
- SIM: Nano-SIM + Nano-SIM + multiple eSIM (max 2 at a time)
- Battery: 5600 mAh
- Charging: 45W wired, QC2.0, 50% in 30 min 15W wireless 4.5W reverse wireless
- Rear camera: 200 MP, f/1.7, 24mm (wide), 1/1.3", 0.6μm, multi-directional PDAF, OIS; 10 MP, f/2.4, 67mm (telephoto), 1/3.94", 1.0μm, PDAF, OIS, 3x optical zoom 12 MP, f/2.2, 13mm, 120˚ (ultrawide), 1/2.55", 1.4μm, dual pixel PDAF
- Front camera: 10 MP, f/2.2, 18mm (ultrawide), 1/3.0", 1.12μm Cover camera: 10 MP, f/2.2, 24mm (wide), 1/3.0", 1.12μm
- Display: Tri-foldable Dynamic LTPO AMOLED 2X, 120Hz, HDR, 1600 nits (peak), 10.0 inches, 305.4 cm2 (~89.6% screen-to-body ratio),1584 x 2160 pixels, 4:3 ratio (~269 ppi density)
- External display: Dynamic LTPO AMOLED 2X, 120Hz, HDR, 2600 nits (peak), Corning Gorilla Glass Ceramic 2, 6.5 inches, 1080 x 2520 pixels, 422 ppi
- Sound: Stereo speakers
- Connectivity: WLAN: Wi-Fi 802.11 a/b/g/n/ac/6e/7, tri-band, Wi-Fi Direct; Bluetooth 5.4, A2DP, LE, aptX HD; Positioning: GPS, GALILEO, GLONASS, BDS, QZSS
- Water resistance: IP48 (up to 1.5m for 30 min)
- Website: Galaxy Z TriFold

The Samsung Galaxy Z TriFold is an Android-based tri-folding smartphone manufactured, developed, and marketed by Samsung Electronics, as part of its Galaxy Z series. It was previewed by the S Flex and G Flex folding concept phones from 2022. The phone was announced on December 1, 2025 in the form of a press release, and was released in select countries on varying dates: first on December 12, 2025 in South Korea, on December 19, 2025 in Singapore and the U.A.E, on December 22, 2025 in Taiwan, and on January 30, 2026 in the United States. It primarily competes with Huawei Mate XT/XTs Ultimate Design.

== History ==
=== Prototype preview ===
In January 2022 at the 2022 CES event, Samsung displayed 2 tri folding concept phones, the Samsung Flex S, and Flex G as both S shape and G Shape style foldables as a preview of a possible tri folding phone. They made their appearances in CES (2023, 2024, and 2025) and MWC (2023, 2024, and 2025).

In the January 2025 Galaxy Unpacked event, Samsung teased a tri-folding phone during their product roadmap presentation, confirming the development and release date planned for the year.

In July 2025, Samsung leaked the Z TriFold's animation files in One UI 8 ahead of its unveiling. In October 2025, Samsung fully unveiled the Z TriFold's design at the 2025 Asia-Pacific Economic Cooperation (APEC) summit without the name being used.

=== Release ===
In December 2025, after months of rumors and speculation, Samsung officially announced the Galaxy Z TriFold in a press release. Sales began in South Korea on December 12, in Singapore on December 19, and in the U.A.E. on December 20., with a U.S. release on January 30, 2026.

On January 31st, 2026, a day after the Z TriFold was released in the U.S., the phone sold out immediately.

=== Discontinuation and possible successor ===
In March 2026, Samsung announced that the Z TriFold sales would end in South Korea and the U.S after just three months of its launch. Despite being the first iteration already discontinued earlier, a successor is currently being developed (rumored to launch in 2027) and is expected to be thinner and lighter.

Samsung describes new features of a second-generation tri-folding phone and explores several modes of use in a lengthy patent filing. The S Pen is also mentioned, along with an explanation of how it might magnetically attach to the frame.

== Specifications ==
=== Design ===
The Galaxy Z TriFold features an aluminum frame, similar to the Galaxy Z Fold 7. It was only sold in a single color option, Crafted Black (just like the Galaxy Z Fold SE).

=== Performance ===
It comes in a sole 16 GB RAM option, with internal storage options having either 512 GB or 1 TB. Just like the Galaxy Z Fold 7, it is also powered by the Snapdragon 8 Elite chipset.

=== Displays ===
The Galaxy Z TriFold features two Dynamic AMOLED 2X 120Hz displays, one of which is tri-foldable, and adopts a 4:3 aspect ratio when unfolded. When unfolded, the phone is 10.0 inches with a screen resolution of 1584×2160, and measures approximately 159.2 × 214.1 × 3.9-4.2 mm. When folded, the phone is 6.5 inches with a screen resolution of 1080×2520, measuring approximately 159.2 × 75 × 12.9 mm.

=== Battery ===
The battery of the Galaxy Z TriFold is 5600 mAh, the largest battery capacity seen on a foldable Samsung phone. The phone has 45W wired charging, which is the highest charging speed in the Galaxy Z series. The phone also supports 15W wireless charging and 4.5W reverse wireless charging.

=== Camera ===
The camera setup of the Samsung Galaxy Z TriFold is the same as the Galaxy Z Fold 7.

| Camera | | Detail |
|---|---|---|
| Rear | Wide | 200 MP, f/1.7, 24mm (wide), 1/1.3", 0.6μm, multi-directional PDAF, OIS |
| Rear | Telephoto | 10 MP, f/2.4, 67mm (telephoto), 1/3.94", 1.0μm, PDAF, OIS, 3x optical zoom |
| Rear | Ultrawide | 12 MP, f/2.2, 13mm, 120˚ (ultrawide), 1/2.55", 1.4μm, dual pixel PDAF |
| Front | | Inner camera: 10 MP, f/2.2, 18mm (ultrawide), 1/3.0", 1.12μm Cover camera: 10 MP, f/2.2, 24mm (wide), 1/3.0", 1.12μm |

=== Software ===
The Galaxy Z TriFold comes pre-installed with Android 16 and One UI 8. Similar to flagship Galaxy devices released since 2024, Samsung has promised 7 years of OS and security updates to this device (with support ending on December 2032).

| | Pre-installed OS | OS Upgrades history | | | | | | | End of support |
| | Pre-installed OS | 1st | 2nd | 3rd | 4th | 5th | 6th | 7th | End of support |
|---|---|---|---|---|---|---|---|---|---|
| Z TriFold | Android 16 (One UI 8.0) Minor One UI update: (One UI 8.5); May 2026 | Android 17 (One UI 9.0); September 2026 | | | | | | | December 2032 |

== Gallery ==
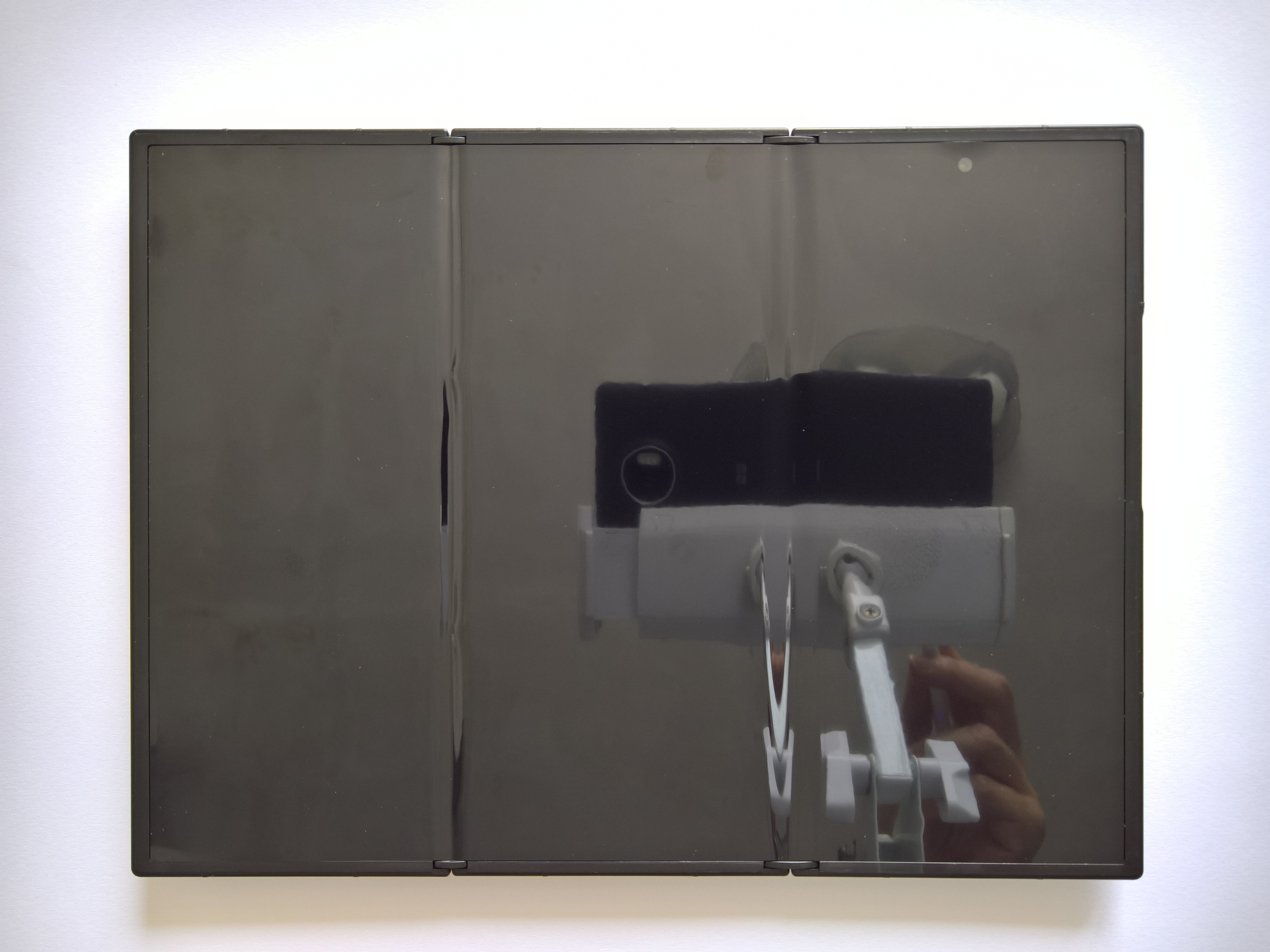

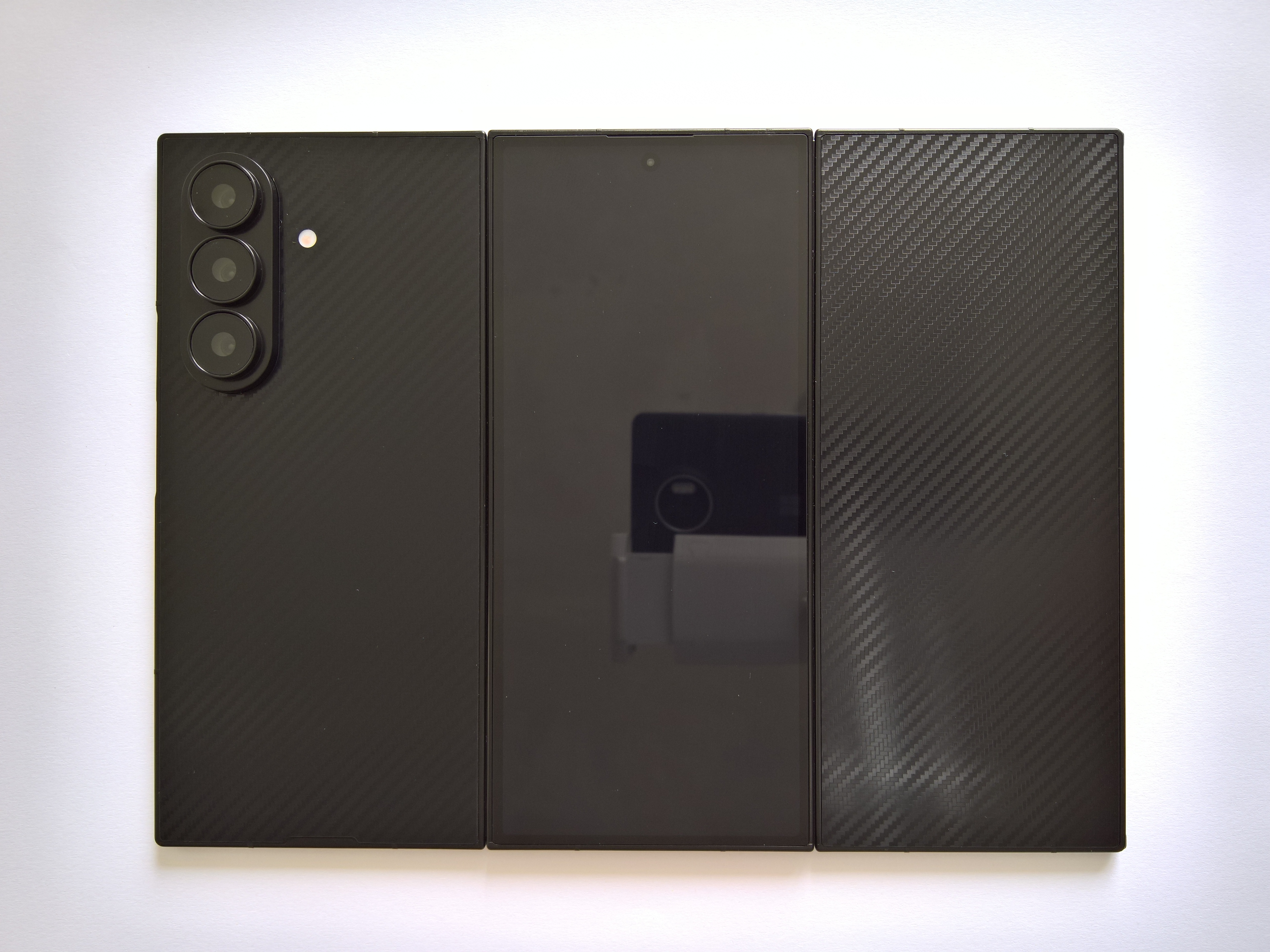

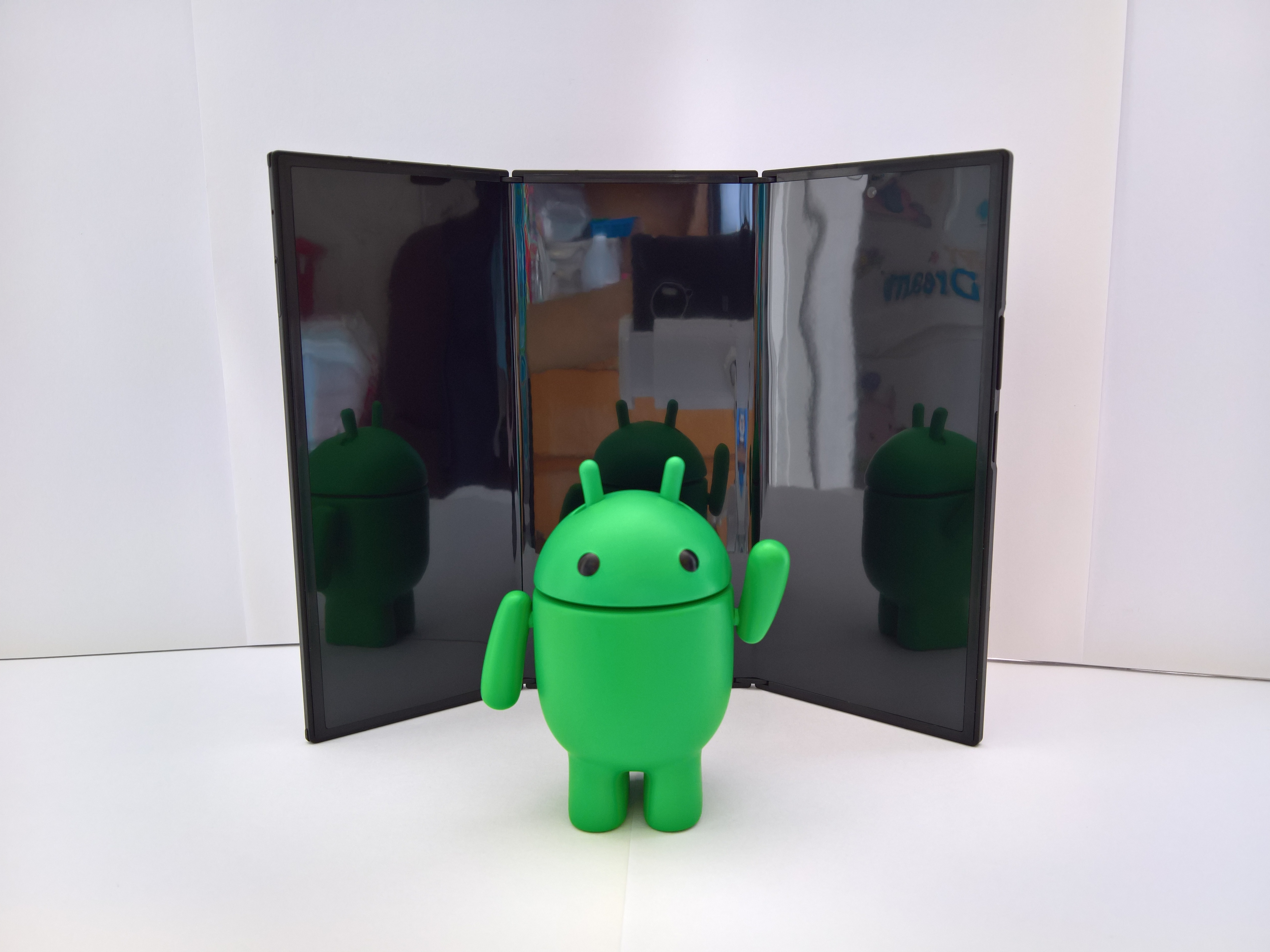

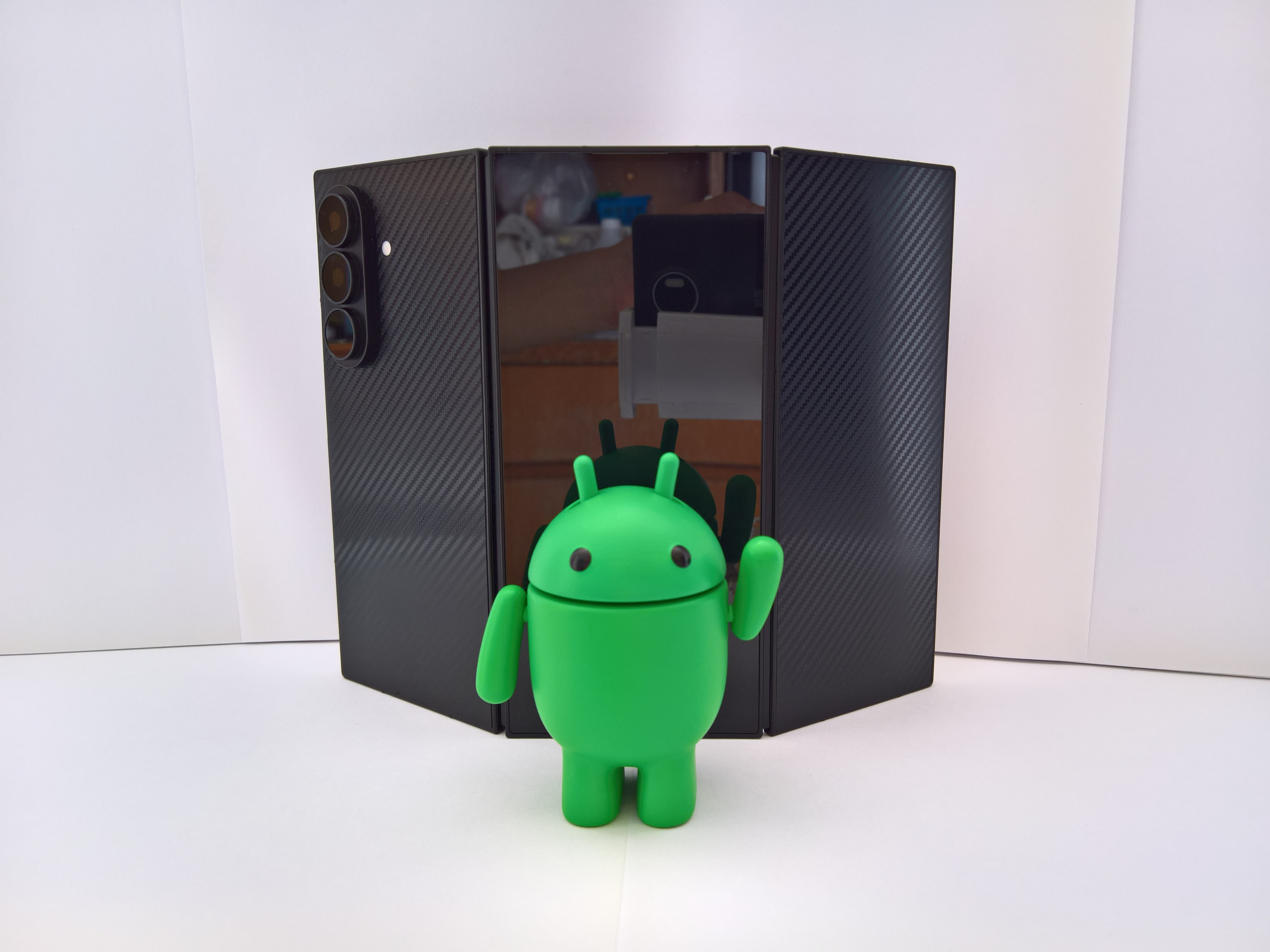

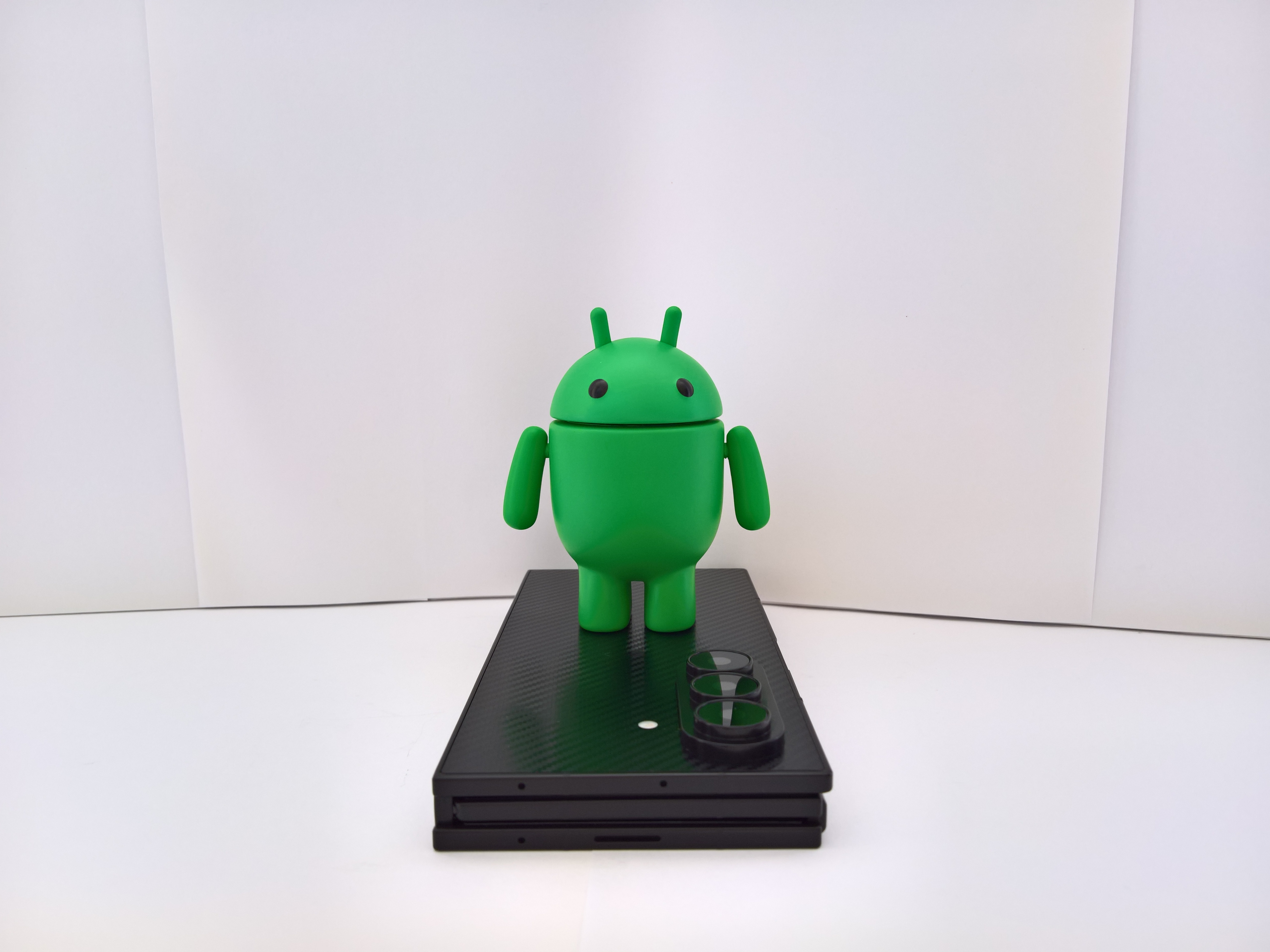

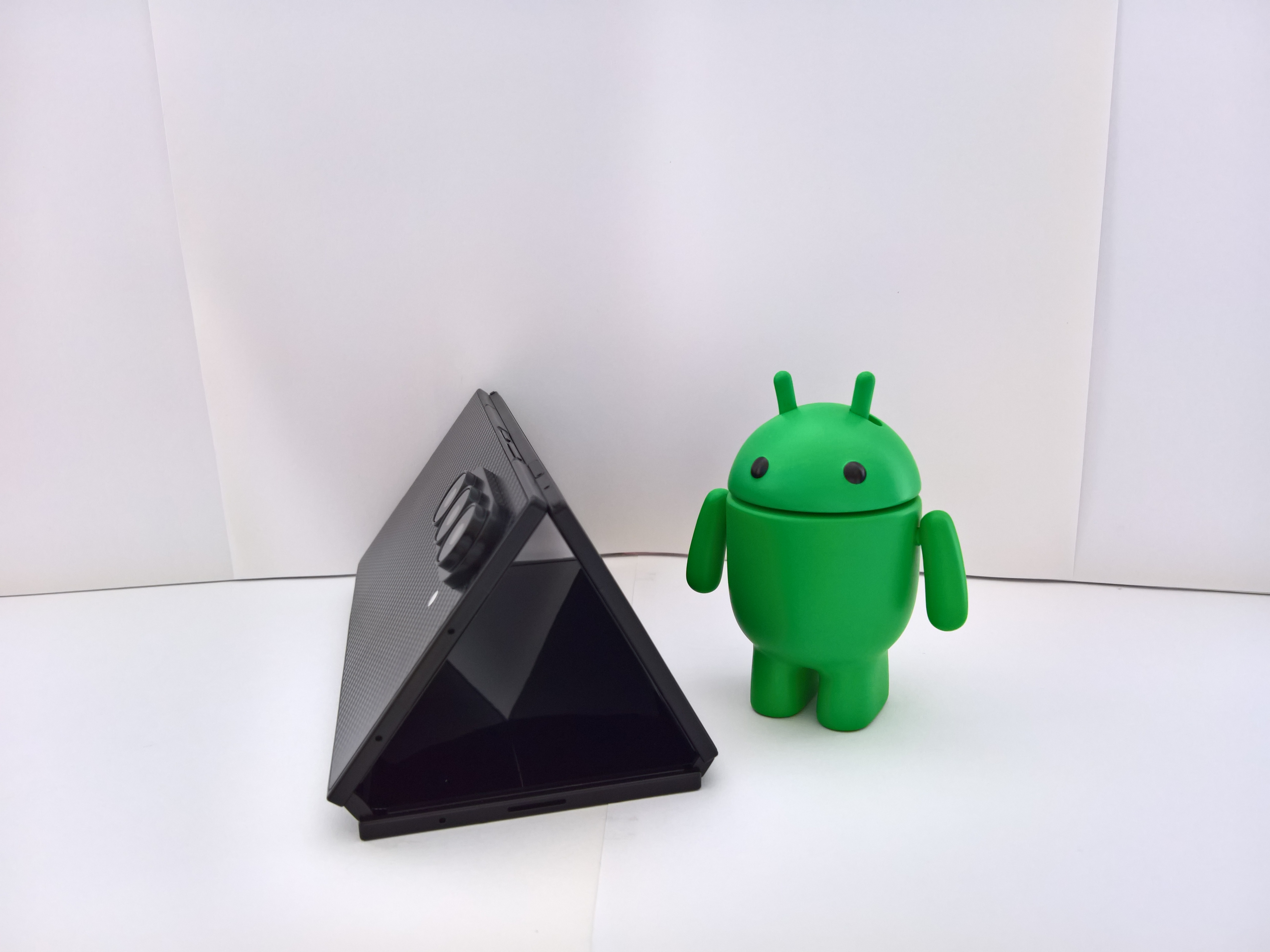

== See also ==
- Samsung Galaxy Z series
- Samsung Galaxy Z Fold 7
- Samsung Galaxy Z Flip 7
- Samsung Galaxy Z Flip 7 FE
