= Samsung Galaxy Z Flip 7 FE =

2025 mid-range foldable smartphone by Samsung Electronics

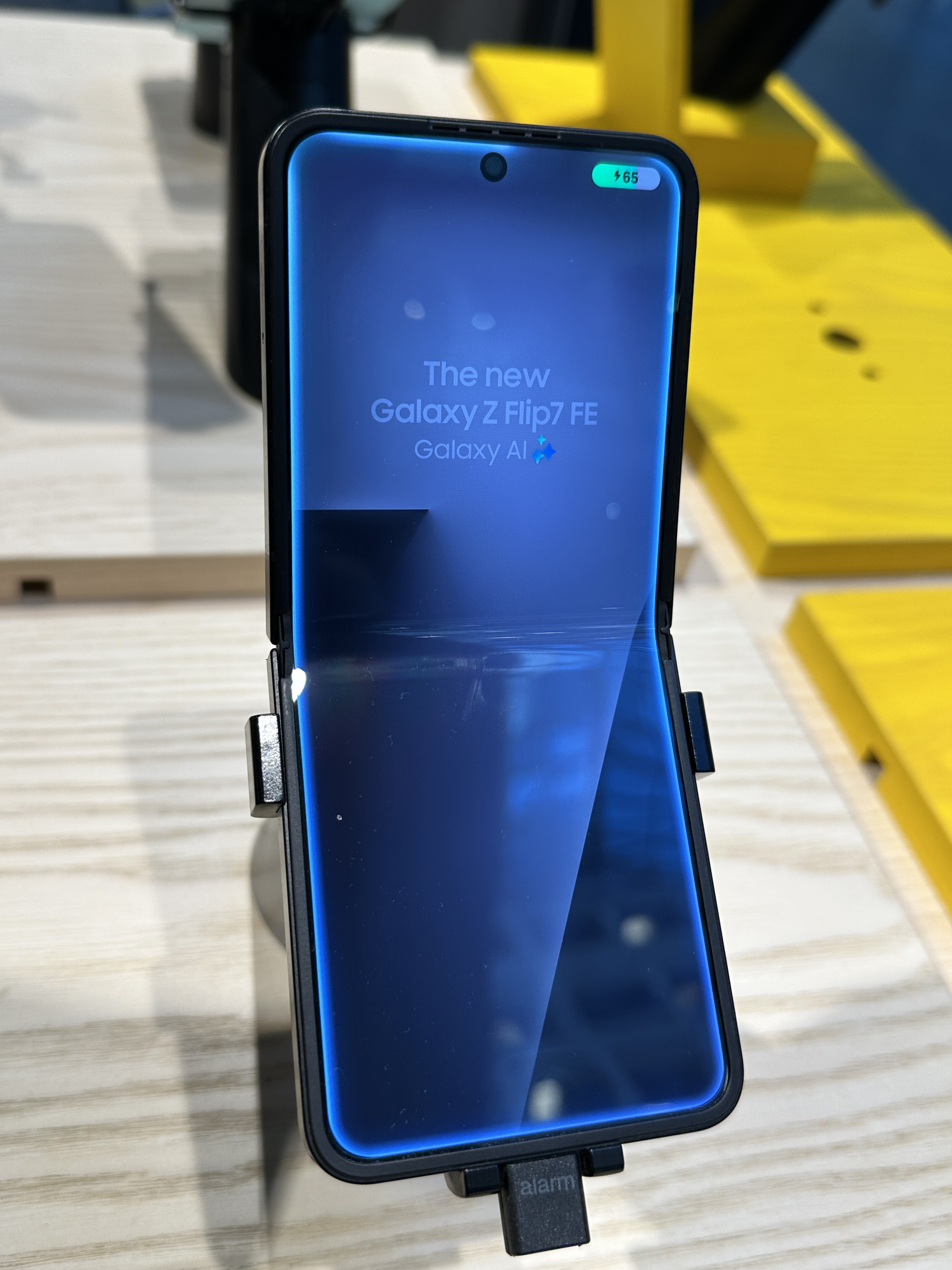
- Samsung Galaxy Z Flip 7 Fan Edition (unfolded)
- Also known as: Samsung Galaxy Z Flip FE; Samsung Galaxy Flip 7 FE (or Flip FE) (in certain European countries)
- Brand: Samsung
- Manufacturer: Samsung Electronics
- Type: Foldable smartphone
- Series: Galaxy Z
- Family: Samsung Galaxy
- First released: July 25, 2025; 15 months ago
- Availability by region: July 25, 2025; 15 months ago
- Discontinued: July 22, 2026; 3 months ago
- Related: Samsung Galaxy S24; Samsung Galaxy Z Fold 6 Samsung Galaxy Z Flip 6 Samsung Galaxy S25; Samsung Galaxy Z Fold 7 Samsung Galaxy Z Flip 7 Samsung Galaxy Z TriFold
- Compatible networks: 2G / 3G / 4G / 5G
- Form factor: Foldable (clamshell)
- Colors: Black, White
- Dimensions: Unfolded: 165.1 × 71.9 × 6.9 mm Folded: 85.1 × 71.9 × 14.9 mm
- Weight: 187 g (6.60 oz)
- Operating system: Original: Android 16 with One UI 8.0; Current: Android 17 with One UI 9.0
- System-on-chip: Exynos 2400 (4 nm)
- CPU: 10-core (1x3.2GHz Cortex-X4 & 2x2.9GHz Cortex-A720 & 3x2.6GHz Cortex-A720 & 4x1.95GHz Cortex-A520)
- GPU: Xclipse 940
- Memory: 8GB
- Storage: 128GB, 256GB
- SIM: Nano-SIM + eSIM + eSIM (max 2 at a time)
- Battery: 4000 mAh
- Charging: 25W wired, QC2.0, 50% in 30 min 15W wireless 4.5W reverse wireless
- Rear camera: 50 MP, f/1.8, 23 mm (wide), 1/1.57", 1.0 μm, dual pixel PDAF, OIS; 12 MP, f/2.2, 13 mm, 123° (ultrawide), 1/3.2", 1.12 μm LED flash, HDR, panorama 4K@30/60fps, 1080p@60/120/240fps, 720p@960fps, HDR10+
- Front camera: 10 MP, f/2.2, 23 mm (wide), 1/3.0", 1.22 μm HDR; 4K@30/60fps
- Display: Foldable Dynamic LTPO AMOLED 2X, 120Hz, HDR10+, 2600 nits (peak), 6.7 inches, 101.5 cm2 (~85.5% screen-to-body ratio), 1080 x 2640 pixels, 21.9:9 ratio (~426 ppi density)
- External display: Super AMOLED, 60Hz, 2600 nits (peak), 3.4 inches, 720 x 748 pixels (~306 ppi) (Gorilla Glass Victus 2)
- Sound: Stereo speakers
- Connectivity: Wi-Fi 802.11 a/b/g/n/ac/6e, tri-band, Wi-Fi Direct; Bluetooth 5.4, A2DP, LE; GPS, GALILEO, GLONASS, BDS, QZSS; NFC; USB Type-C 3.2
- Data inputs: Fingerprint scanner (side-mounted); Accelerometer; Gyro; Proximity; Compass; Barometer
- Water resistance: IP48 (up to 1.5m for 30 min)
- Model: SM-F761B, SM-F761B/DS, SM-F761U1, SM-F761U
- Development status: Released
- Website: Samsung Galaxy Z Flip7 FE (US)

The Samsung Galaxy Z Flip 7 FE (stylized as Samsung Galaxy Z Flip7 FE) is a mid-range Android-based foldable smartphone developed and marketed by Samsung Electronics. Based on the Galaxy Z Flip 6, it is the cheaper model of the Galaxy Z Flip 7 with slightly downgraded specifications. It was officially announced on July 9, 2025, at the Galaxy Unpacked event held in Brooklyn, New York City, United States, alongside the Galaxy Z Flip 7, Galaxy Z Fold 7, and the Galaxy Watch 8 series. It also marks the first FE model released under the Galaxy Z series.

Both phones are very similar, but the FE model has minor specification downgrades in multiple areas: inner and outer screens, cameras, processor, memory, battery and connectivity.

== Design ==
The Galaxy Z Flip 7 FE is only available in two color options: Black and White. Similar to the Galaxy Z Flip 7 and its predecessor, it features a matte glass back panel and aluminum frame.

Model	Galaxy Z Flip 7 FE
Base colors	Black; White

== Specifications ==
=== Display ===
==== Main display ====
The Galaxy Z Flip 7 FE features the same display specifications as the Galaxy Z Flip 6: a 6.7‑inch Dynamic AMOLED 2X main display with a resolution of 2640 × 1080 pixels (21:9 aspect ratio and a pixel density of approximately 397 ppi), variable refresh rate from 1 to 120 Hz, HDR10+ and is protected by Ultra Thin Glass (UTG).

Inner display comparison
Feature	Galaxy Z Flip 7	Galaxy Z Flip 7 FE
Display size	6.9 inches	6.7 inches
Display type	Dynamic AMOLED 2X	
Resolution	2520 x 1080 (FHD+)	2640 x 1080 (FHD+)
Aspect ratio	21:9	22:9 (same as Z Flip 6)
Refresh rate	1–120 Hz (adaptive)	
Protection	Ultra Thin Glass + Gorilla Glass Victus 2	

==== Cover screen ====
The Galaxy Z Flip 7 FE also retains the 3.4‑inch Super AMOLED cover display found in the Galaxy Z Flip 6. The screen is protected by Gorilla Glass Victus 2. It supports basic cover screen features like widgets and camera previews but lacks the expanded app compatibility and AI-driven functions offered by the FlexWindow on the Galaxy Z Flip 7.

Outer display comparison
Feature	Galaxy Z Flip 7	Galaxy Z Flip 7 FE
Cover display Size	4.1 inches	3.4 inches
Resolution	1048 × 948 pixels	720 × 748 pixels
Refresh Rate	Up to 120 Hz	
Protection	Gorilla Glass Victus 2	

=== Performance ===
The Galaxy Z Flip 7 FE uses the Exynos 2400, a 4 nm deca-core processor. The chipset was first used on the Galaxy S24 and S24+. It is the first Galaxy Z Flip device (alongside the Samsung Galaxy Z Flip 7) to use an Exynos processor, as opposed to the Qualcomm Snapdragon chipsets used since the first release of the Galaxy Z Flip.

The chipset is configured with one Cortex-X4 core, four Cortex-A720 cores, and five Cortex-A520 cores. It features the Xclipse 940 GPU, developed in collaboration with AMD, supporting hardware-based ray tracing. Unlike the standard model, the FE version uses a more compact thermal system, which may affect sustained performance during extended workloads.

The Galaxy Z Flip 7 FE only comes with 8 GB of RAM (similar to the Galaxy Z Flip 5), and storage options include 128 GB or 256 GB, all based on UFS 4.0.

=== Battery ===
The Galaxy Z Flip 7 FE features a slightly smaller 4,000 mAh dual-cell battery. It supports 25W wired charging compatible with USB Power Delivery 3.0 and Qualcomm Quick Charge 2.0, with Samsung stating that up to 50% charge can be achieved in approximately 30 minutes under optimal conditions. It also supports 15W wireless and 4.5W reverse wireless charging.

Specification	Galaxy Z Flip 7 FE
Battery capacity	4,000 mAh
Wired charging	25 W (USB Power Delivery 3.0, Quick Charge 2.0)
Fast charging speed	Up to 50% in approximately 30 minutes (under optimal conditions)
Wireless charging	15 W
Reverse wireless charging	4.5 W

=== Camera ===
The Galaxy Z Flip 7 FE features a dual rear camera system, comprising a 50 MP wide-angle sensor (with optical image stabilization (OIS) and Dual Pixel autofocus) and a 12 MP ultra-wide sensor (offering a 123-degree field of view). Camera features include LED flash, HDR, and panorama.

The front-facing camera is a 10 MP sensor with HDR support and 4K video recording at 30 and 60 fps.

Specification	Galaxy Z Flip 7 FE
Rear camera configuration	Dual: Main: 50 MP (f/1.8, 1/1.57", 1.0μm, OIS, Dual Pixel PDAF); Ultrawide: 12 MP (f/2.2, 123°, 1/3.2", 1.12μm)
Front camera	10 MP (f/2.2, 1/3.0", 1.22μm)
Photo features	LED flash, HDR, panorama
Video recording (rear)	4K@30/60fps, 1080p@60/120/240fps, 720p@960fps, HDR10+
Video recording (front)	4K@30/60fps

==== FlexCam ====
FlexCam is a shooting mode that enables hands-free photo and video capture by partially folding the device, typically between 75 and 115 degrees. The mode uses the rear cameras with the cover screen acting as a live viewfinder. It is commonly used for scenarios such as group selfies, vlogging, and video calls. While the core functionality is the same on both devices, the user experience may differ depending on cover screen size and app support.

== Software ==
The Galaxy Z Flip 7 and Z Flip 7 FE ship with Android 16 and One UI 8. Alongside the Galaxy Z Flip 7, it is promised to get up to seven years of operating system and security updates (which is a policy first introduced with the Galaxy S24 series), making it the second Galaxy Z series phone to do so after the Galaxy Z6 series.

	Pre-installed OS	OS Upgrades history							End of support
	Pre-installed OS	1st	2nd	3rd	4th	5th	6th	7th	End of support
Z Flip 7 FE	Android 16 (One UI 8.0) Minor One UI update: (One UI 8.5); May 2026	Android 17 (One UI 9.0); September 2026							Within 2032

=== Galaxy AI ===
Galaxy AI features, first introduced with the Galaxy S24 lineup, are supported on both models as part of One UI 8. Key tools include Interpreter, Chat Assist, and Generative Edit, among other available features. These features use a combination of on-device and cloud-based processing, depending on the task and language.

== Gallery ==
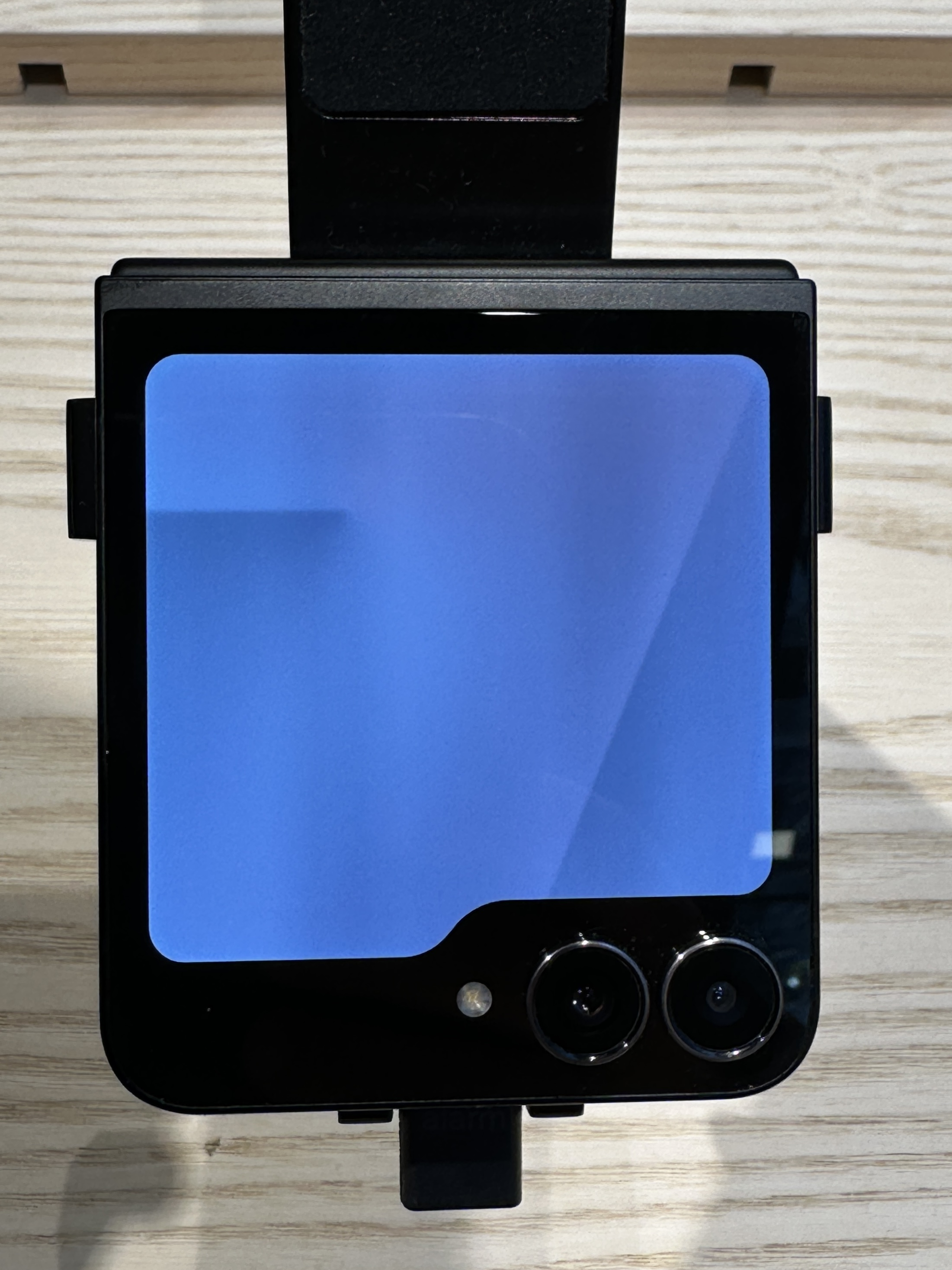
Samsung Galaxy Z Flip 7 Fan Edition (folded)

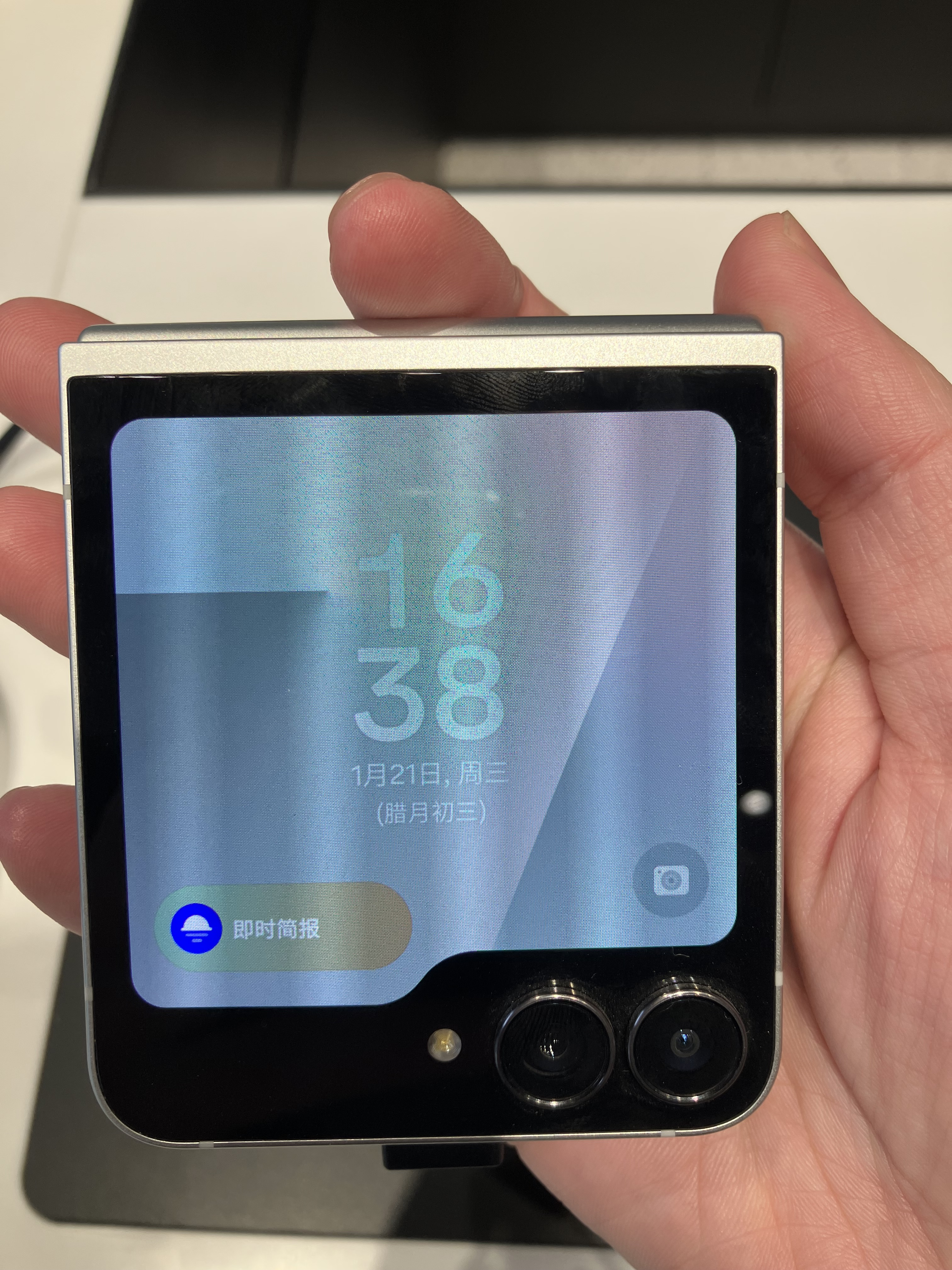
Holding a Samsung Galaxy Z Flip 7 FE when folded

== See also ==
- Samsung Galaxy Z series
- Samsung Galaxy Z Fold 7
- Samsung Galaxy Z Flip 7
- Samsung Galaxy Z TriFold
