= Samsung Galaxy Z Flip 7 =

2025 foldable smartphone by Samsung Electronics

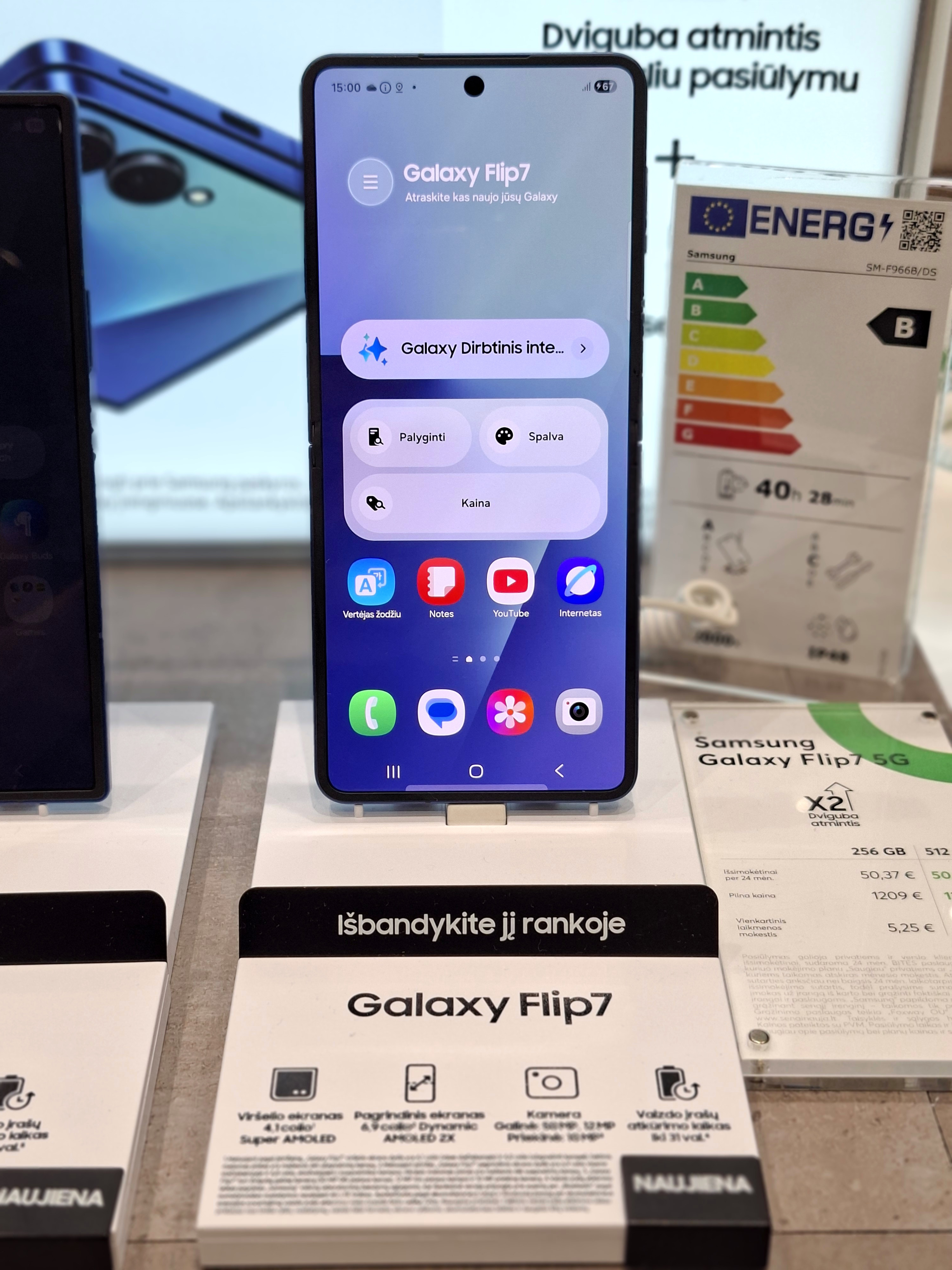
- Samsung Galaxy Z Flip 7 in Blue Shadow unfolded
- Also known as: Samsung Galaxy Flip 7 (in certain European countries)
- Brand: Samsung
- Manufacturer: Samsung Electronics
- Type: Foldable smartphone
- Series: Galaxy Z
- Family: Samsung Galaxy
- First released: July 25, 2025; 15 months ago
- Availability by region: July 25, 2025; 15 months ago
- Discontinued: July 22, 2026; 3 months ago
- Predecessor: Samsung Galaxy Z Flip 6
- Successor: Samsung Galaxy Z Flip 8
- Related: Samsung Galaxy S25; Samsung Galaxy Z Fold 7 Samsung Galaxy Z Flip 7 FE; Samsung Galaxy Z TriFold
- Compatible networks: 2G GSM / 3G WCDMA / 4G LTE / 5G
- Form factor: Foldable (clamshell)
- Colors: Jet Black, Blue Shadow, Coral Red, Mint
- Dimensions: Unfolded: 166.7 × 75.2 × 6.5 mm Folded: 85.5 × 75.2 × 13.7 mm
- Weight: 188 g (6.63 oz)
- Operating system: Original: Android 16 with One UI 8.0; Current: Android 17 with One UI 9.0
- System-on-chip: Exynos 2500 (3 nm)
- CPU: 10-core (1x3.3GHz Cortex-X5 & 2x2.74GHz Cortex-A725 & 5x2.36GHz Cortex-A725 & 2x1.8GHz Cortex-A520)
- GPU: Xclipse 950
- Memory: 12GB
- Storage: 256GB, 512GB
- SIM: Nano-SIM + eSIM + eSIM (max 2 at a time)
- Battery: 4300 mAh
- Charging: 25W wired, QC2.0, 50% in 30 min 15W wireless 4.5W reverse wireless
- Rear camera: 50 MP, f/1.8, 23 mm (wide), 1/1.57", 1.0 μm, dual pixel PDAF, OIS; 12 MP, f/2.2, 13 mm, 123° (ultrawide), 1/3.2", 1.12 μm LED flash, HDR, panorama 4K@30/60fps, 1080p@60/120/240fps, 720p@960fps, HDR10+
- Front camera: 10 MP, f/2.2, 23 mm (wide), 1/3.0", 1.22 μm HDR; 4K@30/60fps
- Display: Foldable Dynamic LTPO AMOLED 2X, 120Hz, HDR10+, 2600 nits (peak), 6.9 inches, 111.2 cm2 (~88.7% screen-to-body ratio), 1080 × 2520 pixels, 21:9 ratio (~397 ppi density)
- External display: Super AMOLED, 120Hz, 2600 nits (peak), 4.1 inches, 948 × 1048 pixels (Gorilla Glass Victus 2)
- Sound: Stereo speakers with 32-bit/384kHz audio
- Connectivity: Wi-Fi 802.11 a/b/g/n/ac/6e/7, tri-band, Wi-Fi Direct; Bluetooth 5.4, A2DP, LE; GPS, GALILEO, GLONASS, BDS, QZSS; USB Type-C 3.2, OTG
- Data inputs: Fingerprint (side-mounted); Accelerometer; Gyro; Proximity; Compass; Barometer
- Water resistance: IP48 (up to 1.5m for 30 minutes)
- Model: SM-F766B, SM-F766B/DS, SM-F766U, SM-F766U1
- Website: Samsung Galaxy Z Flip7 (US)

The Samsung Galaxy Z Flip 7 (stylized as Samsung Galaxy Z Flip7) is a clamshell-styled foldable smartphone developed and marketed by Samsung Electronics. It was officially announced on July 9, 2025, at the Samsung's Galaxy Unpacked event held in Brooklyn, New York City, United States, alongside the Galaxy Z Fold 7 and the Galaxy Watch 8 series, and were released on July 25, 2025.

This phone marked the sixth-generation Z Flip (as the number two was skipped with the release of Samsung Galaxy Z Flip 3) and succeeded the Galaxy Z Flip 6. Compared to its predecessor, the phone's most visually striking difference is the larger (4.1-inches) edge-to-edge external cover screen. The stretched 22:9 aspect ratio of the main display inside was changed into a slightly wider 21:9 format. The Galaxy Z Flip 7 was also the first in the series to run on an Exynos processor rather than Snapdragon.

Samsung also introduced a derivative model, the Galaxy Z Flip 7 FE, which features a slimmer and lighter design and is equipped with a 50 MP main camera, and it is based on the full predecessor. The Galaxy Z Flip 7 and its FE model have been succeeded by the Samsung Galaxy Z Flip 8 on July 22, 2026.

== Design ==
The Galaxy Z Flip 7 is available in four color options at launch: Jet Black, Blue Shadow, Coral Red, and Mint, with the latter being offered exclusively through Samsung's online store. It features a matte glass back panel and aluminum frame.

As part of its physical refinement, the Galaxy Z Flip 7 is now approximately 0.4 mm thinner when unfolded compared to its predecessor, the Galaxy Z Flip 6, contributing to a more compact hardware profile.

Model	Galaxy Z Flip 7
Base colors	Jet Black; Blue Shadow; Coral Red
Online exclusive color	Mint

== Specifications ==
=== Display ===
==== Main display ====
The Galaxy Z Flip 7 features a 6.9‑inch Dynamic AMOLED 2X main display with a resolution of 2520 × 1080 pixels (21:9 aspect ratio) and a pixel density of approximately 397 ppi. It supports a variable refresh rate from 1 to 120 Hz, enabling adaptive performance based on content type. The display also supports HDR10+ and is protected by Ultra Thin Glass (UTG).

Inner display comparison
Feature	Galaxy Z Flip 7	Galaxy Z Flip 7 FE
Display size	6.9 inches	6.7 inches
Display type	Dynamic AMOLED 2X	
Resolution	2520 × 1080 (FHD+)	2640 × 1080 (FHD+)
Aspect ratio	21:9	22:9 (same as Z Flip 6)
Refresh rate	1–120 Hz (adaptive)	
Protection	Ultra Thin Glass + Gorilla Glass Victus 2	

==== Cover screen and FlexWindow ====
The Galaxy Z Flip 7 features a 4.1‑inch Super AMOLED cover screen, referred to by Samsung as the FlexWindow, with a resolution of 948 × 1048 pixels and a refresh rate of up to 120 Hz.

Compared to the Galaxy Z Flip 6, the FlexWindow has been enlarged by approximately 2.2-inches in usable screen area, enabled in part by a 0.7 mm bezel reduction. This results in improved content visibility and expanded touch interaction zones. The screen is protected by Gorilla Glass Victus 2.

The FlexWindow enables access to widgets, notifications, camera previews, and selected apps—such as Google Gemini, Now Bar, and Now Brief—without unfolding the device.

Outer display comparison
Feature	Galaxy Z Flip 7	Galaxy Z Flip 7 FE
Cover display Size	4.1 inches	3.4 inches
Resolution	948 × 1048 pixels	720 × 748 pixels
Refresh Rate	Up to 120 Hz	
Protection	Gorilla Glass Victus 2	

=== Performance ===
The Galaxy Z Flip 7 is powered by the Exynos 2500 processor, built on a 3 nm fabrication process. It is the first Galaxy Z Flip device (alongside the Galaxy Z Flip 7 FE) to use an Exynos processor, as opposed to the Qualcomm Snapdragon chipsets used since the first release of the Galaxy Z Flip.

It features an octa-core CPU based on the latest Cortex-X5 architecture. To maintain thermal stability during high-performance scenarios such as gaming or multitasking, the device includes a large vapor chamber cooling system.

The Galaxy Z Flip 7 is only available with 12 GB of RAM, paired with either 256 GB or 512 GB of internal storage which utilizes UFS 4.0.

=== Battery ===
The Galaxy Z Flip 7 is equipped with a 4,300 mAh dual-cell battery. It supports 25W wired charging (compatible with USB Power Delivery 3.0 and Qualcomm Quick Charge 2.0),15W wireless and 4.5W reverse wireless charging.

Specification	Galaxy Z Flip 7
Battery capacity	4,300 mAh
Wired charging	25 W (USB Power Delivery 3.0, Quick Charge 2.0)
Fast charging speed	Up to 50% in approximately 30 minutes (under optimal conditions)
Wireless charging	15 W
Reverse wireless charging	4.5 W
References	

=== Camera ===
The Galaxy Z Flip 7 features a dual rear camera system, comprising a 50 MP wide-angle sensor (with optical image stabilization (OIS) and Dual Pixel autofocus) and a 12 MP ultra-wide sensor (offering a 123-degree field of view). Camera features include LED flash, HDR, and panorama.

The front-facing camera is a 10 MP sensor with HDR support and 4K video recording at 30 and 60 fps.

Specification	Galaxy Z Flip 7
Rear camera configuration	Dual: Main: 50 MP (f/1.8, 1/1.57", 1.0μm, OIS, Dual Pixel PDAF); Ultrawide: 12 MP (f/2.2, 123°, 1/3.2", 1.12μm)
Front camera	10 MP (f/2.2, 1/3.0", 1.22μm)
Photo features	LED flash, HDR, panorama
Video recording (rear)	4K@30/60fps, 1080p@60/120/240fps, 720p@960fps, HDR10+
Video recording (front)	4K@30/60fps

==== FlexCam ====
FlexCam is a shooting mode that enables hands-free photo and video capture by partially folding the device, typically between 75 and 115 degrees. The mode uses the rear cameras with the cover screen acting as a live viewfinder. It is commonly used for scenarios such as group selfies, vlogging, and video calls. While the core functionality is the same on both devices, the user experience may differ depending on cover screen size and app support.

== Software ==
The Galaxy Z Flip 7 and Z Flip 7 FE ship with Android 16 and One UI 8. Alongside the Galaxy Z Fold 7, it is promised to get up to seven years of operating system and security updates, which is a policy first introduced with the Galaxy S24 series, making it the second Galaxy Z series phone to do so after the Galaxy Z6 series.

	Pre-installed OS	OS Upgrades history							End of support
	Pre-installed OS	1st	2nd	3rd	4th	5th	6th	7th	End of support
Z Flip 7	Android 16 (One UI 8.0) Minor One UI update: (One UI 8.5); May 2026	Android 17 (One UI 9.0); September 2026							Within 2032

=== Galaxy AI ===
Galaxy AI features, first introduced with the Galaxy S24 lineup, are supported on both models as part of One UI 8. Key tools include Interpreter, Chat Assist, and Generative Edit, among other available features. These features use a combination of on-device and cloud-based processing, depending on the task and language.

== See also ==
- Samsung Galaxy Z series
- Samsung Galaxy Z Fold 7
- Samsung Galaxy Z TriFold
- Samsung Galaxy Z Flip 7 FE

Preceded by Samsung Galaxy Z Flip 6	Samsung Galaxy Z Flip 7; 2025	Succeeded by Samsung Galaxy Z Flip 8
