= Samsung Galaxy Z series =

Foldable phones from Samsung Electronics

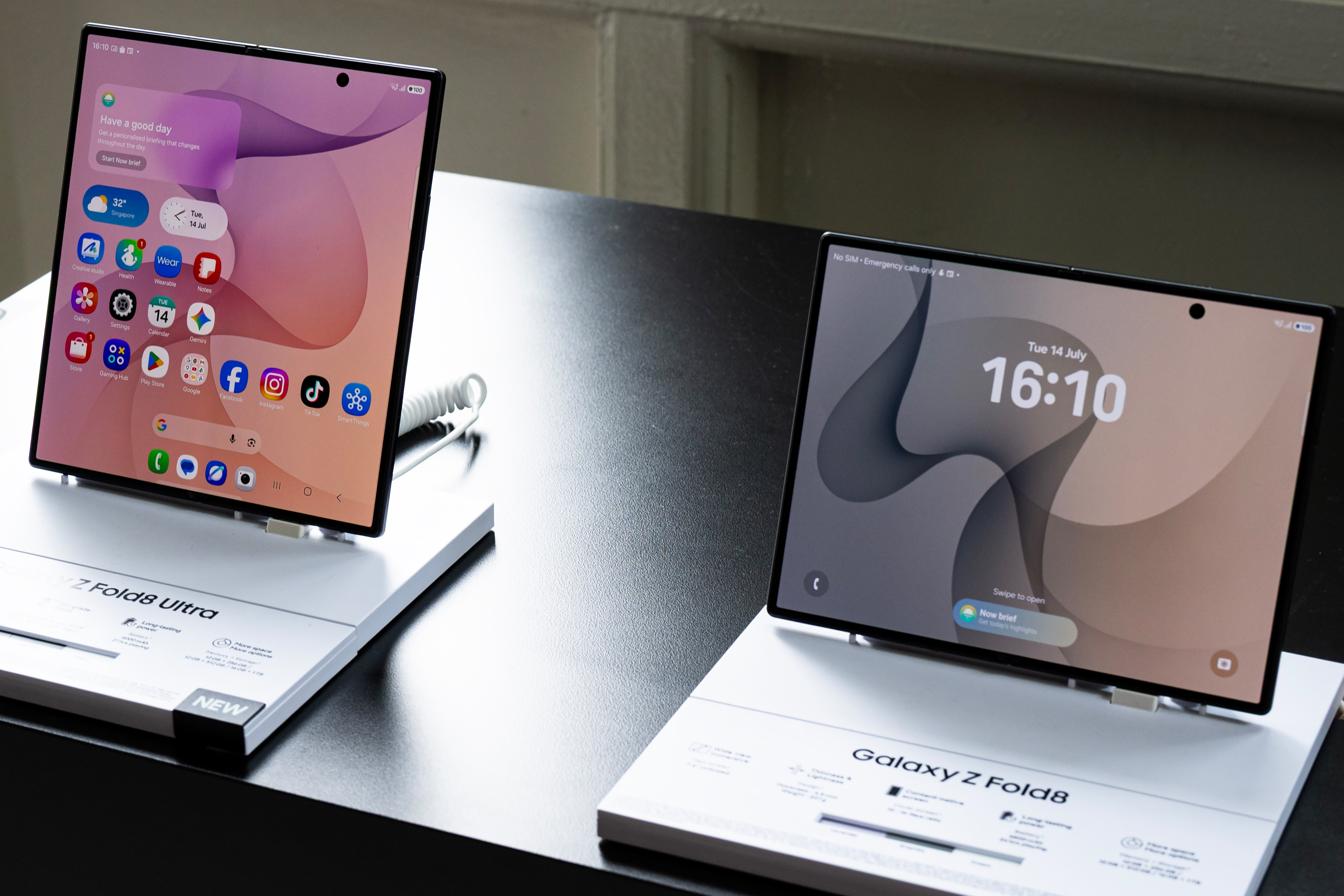
- The Samsung Galaxy Z Fold 8 (right) and Z Fold 8 Ultra (left) in unfolded form
- Developer: Samsung Electronics
- Product family: Samsung Galaxy
- Type: Foldable smartphones
- Released: September 6, 2019; 7 years ago
- Operating system: Android
- System on a chip: Qualcomm Snapdragon (2019–); Samsung Exynos (2025–)
- Input: Touchscreen
- Related: Samsung Galaxy S series Samsung Galaxy Tab; Samsung Galaxy Note; Samsung Galaxy Tab S series Samsung Galaxy Watch series

The Samsung Galaxy Z series (named as Samsung Galaxy Foldables in certain territories since 2022) is a line of foldable smartphones manufactured by Samsung Electronics since 2019, part of the wider range of Samsung Galaxy products. The Z series consists of smartphones running Android with flexible displays, namely the Z Fold line of book-style foldables and the Z Flip line of clamshell-style ("flip phone") foldables.

Galaxy Z series release timeline
2019	Samsung Galaxy Z Fold / Z Fold 5G
2020	Samsung Galaxy Z Flip
2020	Samsung Galaxy Z Flip 5G
2020	Samsung Galaxy Z Fold 2
2021	Samsung Galaxy Z Fold 3
2021	Samsung Galaxy Z Flip 3
2021	Samsung Galaxy Z Flip 3 Bespoke Edition
2022	Samsung Galaxy Z Fold 4
2022	Samsung Galaxy Z Flip 4
2023	Samsung Galaxy Z Fold 5
2023	Samsung Galaxy Z Flip 5
2024	Samsung Galaxy Z Fold 6
2024	Samsung Galaxy Z Flip 6
2024	Samsung Galaxy Z Fold SE
2025	Samsung Galaxy Z Fold 7
2025	Samsung Galaxy Z Flip 7
2025	Samsung Galaxy Z Flip 7 FE
2025	Samsung Galaxy Z TriFold
2026	Samsung Galaxy Z Fold 8
2026	Samsung Galaxy Z Fold 8 Ultra
2026	Samsung Galaxy Z Flip 8

== History ==
In 2018, Samsung announced the Galaxy X prototype before manufacture and release of the foldable under the new name Galaxy Fold in 2019. This marks the first phone since the Galaxy S6 and Galaxy Note5 series to remove the microSD card slot. With the 2020 announcement of the Galaxy Z Flip, Samsung's future foldable smartphones are part of the Galaxy Z series. Unlike the Galaxy Fold, the Z Flip folds vertically and uses a hybrid glass coating branded as "Infinity Flex Display”. The Galaxy Z Fold 2 5G is the second generation of Samsung's inward fold design introduced with the original Fold. It features a significantly larger front screen than its predecessor, a high refresh rate 120 Hz folding screen, minimal bezels and improved cameras.

In March 2022, Samsung began to rebrand the Galaxy Fold and Flip devices in Ukraine, Moldova and the Baltic States (Estonia, Latvia, and Lithuania) to remove the “Z” branding from their names. This is due to the Russian invasion of Ukraine, as the letter “Z” has been used as a symbol by the Russian military and as a pro-war symbol by the Russian government.

In January 2022, at the 2022 CES event, Samsung displayed 2 tri-folding concept phones, the Samsung Flex S, and Flex G as both S shape and G Shape style foldables as a preview of a possible tri-folding phone. They made their recent appearances at CES 2023, CES 2024, and CES 2025, and in MWC 2023, MWC 2024, and MWC 2025.

At the January 2025 Galaxy Unpacked event, Samsung teased a tri-folding phone during their product roadmap presentation, confirming the development and release date planned for the year.

In December 2025, after months of rumors and speculation, Samsung officially announced the Galaxy Z TriFold in a press release with 16 GB of RAM, 512 GB to 1 TB, two Dynamic AMOLED 2X 120Hz Displays, a 10-inch screen with a resolution of 1584x2160, and a 5600 mAh battery.

In July 2026, Samsung officially announced two models of the Galaxy Z Fold 8: The Galaxy Z Fold 8 and the Galaxy Z Fold 8 Ultra, with improvements to the battery, a new processor, upgraded display and introducing a new model to the lineup—with the former having a wide screen similar to a passport, and the latter being the official successor to the Galaxy Z Fold 7. Samsung called the Z Fold 8 Ultra its "most advanced foldable design" and slimmest foldable it has developed.

== Model comparison ==
=== Z Fold ===
Model	Z Fold 8 Ultra	Z Fold 8	Z TriFold	Z Fold 7	Z Fold SE	Z Fold 6	Z Fold 5	Z Fold 4	Z Fold 3	Z Fold 2	Fold
Display
Size	8" (internal) / 6.5" (external)	7.6" (internal) / 5.5" (external)	10" (internal) / 6.5" (external)	8" (internal) / 6.5" (external)		7.6" (internal) / 6.3" (external)	7.6" (internal) / 6.2" (external)				7.3" (internal) / 4.6" (external)
Resolution	2504×2256 / 2520×1080	2448×1828 / 1972×1248	2160×1584 / 2520×1080	2184×1968 / 2520×1080		2160×1856 / 2376×968	2176×1812 / 2316×904		2208×1768 / 2260×816		2152×1536 / 1680×720
Density	422 ppi	403 ppi	269 ppi / 422 ppi	368 ppi		374 ppi	373 ppi		374 ppi		362 ppi
Refresh rate	120 Hz										60 Hz
Type	AMOLED										
CPU, GPU, RAM and Storage
Processor	Snapdragon 8 Elite Gen 5		Snapdragon 8 Elite		Snapdragon 8 Gen 3 for Galaxy		Snapdragon 8 Gen 2 for Galaxy	Snapdragon 8+ Gen 1	Snapdragon 888	Snapdragon 865+	Snapdragon 855+ (W20 5G model)
Cores	8										
Frequency	Up to 4.74 GHz		Up to 4.47 GHz		Up to 3.39 GHz		Up to 3.36 GHz	3.19 GHz	2.84 GHz	3.09 GHz	2.84 GHz
GPU	Adreno 840		Adreno 830		Adreno 750		Adreno 740	Adreno 730	Adreno 660	Adreno 650	Adreno 640
Memory	12 / 16 GB		16 GB	12 / 16 GB	16 GB	12 GB					
Internal Storage	256 / 512 GB / 1 TB		512 GB / 1 TB	256 / 512 GB / 1 TB	512 GB	256 / 512 GB / 1 TB			256 / 512 GB	512 GB	
Expandable storage	No										Yes (microSD)
Battery and Charging
Capacity	5000 mAh	4800 mAh	5600 mAh	4400 mAh						4500 mAh	4380 mAh
Charging	45W wired, 20W wireless		45W wired, 15W wireless	25W wired, 15W wireless						25W wired	15W wired
Technology	Li-Po										
Port	USB Type-C										
Wireless	Yes										No
Fast charge	Yes										
Connectivity
NFC	Yes										
Wi-Fi	a, b, g, n, ac, ax, be					a, b, g, n, ac, ax					a, b, g, n, ac
Bluetooth	6.0		5.4		5.3			5.2		5.1	5.0
Cellular	5G										4G
GPS	Yes										
Camera
Model	Z Fold 8 Ultra	Z Fold 8	Z TriFold	Z Fold 7	Z Fold SE	Z Fold 6	Z Fold 5	Z Fold 4	Z Fold 3	Z Fold 2	Fold
Sensors	3	2	3								
Resolution	200 + 50 + 10 MP	50 + 50 MP	200 + 12 + 10 MP			50 + 12 + 10 MP			12 + 12 + 12 MP		12 + 12 + 16 MP
Aperture	f/1.7, f/1.9, f/2.4	f/1.8, f/1.9	f/1.7, f/2.2, f/2.4			f/1.8, f/2.2, f/2.4					f/1.5–f/2.4, f/2.2, f/2.4
Front cameras	2										
Front camera resolution	10 + 10 MP				10 + 4 MP					10 + 10 MP	10 + 8 MP
Front camera aperture	f/2.2				f/2.2, f/1.8					f/2.2	f/2.2, f/1.9
Video	8K@30fps, 4K@60fps, 1080p@60/120/240fps (gyro-EIS), 10-bit HDR, HDR10+			8K@30fps, 4K@60fps, 1080p@60/120/240fps (gyro-EIS), 720p@960fps (gyro-EIS), 10-bit HDR, HDR10+		8K@24fps, 4K@60fps, 1080p@60/240fps (gyro-EIS), HDR10+			4K@60fps, 1080p@30/60/240fps (gyro-EIS), HDR10+	4K@60fps, 1080p@60/240fps (gyro-EIS), 720p@960fps (gyro-EIS), HDR10	
Other
Operating System (at launch)	Android 17		Android 16		Android 14		Android 13	Android 12	Android 11	Android 10	Android 9
Water resistance	IP48						IPX8			None	
Height	158.4 mm	123.9 mm	159.2 mm	158.4 mm		153.5 mm	154.9 mm	155.1 mm	158.2 mm	159.2 mm	160.9 mm
Length	143.2 mm	161.4 mm	214.1 mm	143.2 mm		132.6 mm	129.9 mm	130.1 mm	128.1 mm	128.2 mm	117.9 mm
Depth	4.1 mm	4.5 mm	3.9 mm	4.2 mm		5.6 mm	6.1 mm	6.3 mm	6.4 mm	6.9 mm	
Weight	215 g	201 g	309 g	215 g		239 g	253 g	263 g	271 g	279 g	263 g
Release	July 2026		December 1, 2025	July 2025	October 2024	July 2024	July 2023	August 2022	August 2021	September 2020	September 2019

=== Z Flip ===
Model	Z Flip 8	Z Flip 7	Z Flip 7 FE	Z Flip 6	Z Flip 5	Z Flip 4	Z Flip 3	Z Flip 5G	Z Flip LTE
Display
Size	6.9" (internal) / 4.1" (external)		6.7" (internal) / 3.4" (external)			6.7" (internal) / 1.9" (external)		6.7" (internal) / 1.1" (external)	
Resolution	2520 x 1080 / 1048 x 948		2640 × 1080 / 720 × 748			2640 × 1080 / 260 × 512		2636 × 1080 / 112 × 300	
Density	397 ppi		425 ppi						
Refresh rate	120 Hz							60 Hz	
Type	Dynamic LTPO AMOLED 2X					Dynamic AMOLED 2X			
CPU, GPU, RAM and storage
Processor	Snapdragon 8 Elite Gen 5 / Exynos 2600	Exynos 2500	Exynos 2400	Snapdragon 8 Gen 3 for Galaxy	Snapdragon 8 Gen 2 for Galaxy	Snapdragon 8+ Gen 1	Snapdragon 888	Snapdragon 865+	Snapdragon 855+
Cores	8 / 10	10		8					
Frequency	4.74 GHz / 3.8 GHz	3.3 GHz	3.2 GHz	3.39 GHz	3.36 GHz	3.19 GHz	2.84 GHz	3.09 GHz	2.96 GHz
GPU	Adreno 840 / Xclipse 960	Xclipse 950	Xclipse 940	Adreno 750	Adreno 740	Adreno 730	Adreno 660	Adreno 650	Adreno 640
Memory	12 GB		8 GB	12 GB	8 GB				
Internal storage	256 / 512 GB		128 / 256 GB	256 / 512 GB		128 / 256 / 512 GB	128 / 256 GB	256 GB	
Expandable?	No								
Capacity	4300 mAh		4000 mAh		3700 mAh		3300 mAh		
Technology	Li-Po								
Port	USB Type-C								
Wireless charging	Yes								
Fast charging	Yes								
Connectivity
NFC	Yes								
Wi-Fi	a, b, g, n, ac, ax, be		a, b, g, n, ac, ax					a, b, g, n, ac	
Bluetooth	5.4			5.3		5.2	5.1	5.0	
Cellular	5G								4G
GPS	Yes								
3.5 mm jack	No								
Camera
Sensors	2								
Resolution	50 + 12 MP				12 + 12 MP				
Aperture	f/1.8, f/2.2								
Front camera resolution	10 MP								
Front camera aperture	f/2.2					f/2.4			
Video	4K@30/60fps, 1080p@60/120/240fps, HDR10+			4K@30/60fps, 1080p@60/240fps, HDR10+				4K@30/60fps, 1080p@60/240fps, 720p@960fps, HDR10+	
Others
Operating system	Android 17	Android 16		Android 14	Android 13	Android 12	Android 11	Android 10	
Protection certificate	IP48				IPX8			No	
Height	166.9 mm	166.7 mm	166.1 mm		165.1 mm		166 mm	167.3 mm	
Length	75.4 mm	75.2 mm	73.7 mm		73.6 mm		72.2 mm	73.6 mm	
Depth	6.1 mm	6.5 mm	7.2 mm			6.9 mm			
Weight	180 g	188 g	189 g		187 g	183 g			
Release	July 2026	July 2025		July 2024	August 2023	August 2022	August 2021	August 2020	February 2020
