= Royole FlexPai =

Foldable Android smartphone by Royole

- Brand: Royole
- Manufacturer: Royole
- First released: 8 January 2018; 8 years ago
- Availability by region: 1 December 2018; 7 years ago (Worldwide)
- Successor: Royole FlexPai 2
- Form factor: Folding slate
- Dimensions: Unfolded; 160.9 mm (6.33 in) H; 117.9 mm (4.64 in) W; 6.9 mm (0.27 in) D; Folded; 160.9 mm (6.33 in) H; 62.9 mm (2.48 in) W; 15.5 mm (0.61 in) D
- Weight: 320 g (11 oz)
- Operating system: Original: Android 9.0 "Pie"
- System-on-chip: Qualcomm Snapdragon 8 Series, 8150, 64-bit Processor
- CPU: Octa-Core 2.8GHz Clock Speed
- GPU: Qualcomm Adreno 640
- Memory: 6 GB / 8 GB LPDDR4X
- Storage: 128 GB / 512 GB UFS 3.0
- Removable storage: External Memory Supported Up to 256GB
- Battery: Non-Removable 4,000 mAh Lithium-Polymer, 5V/5A
- Rear camera: 20 MP, f/1.8 aperture
- Front camera: 16 MP, f/1.8 aperture
- Display: Dynamic AMOLED, FHD+, 4:3 Aspect Ratio (expanded mode), 311PPI: Unfolded: 1920 x 1440, 7.8 in (20 cm), 4:3 ratio, 311 ppi; Folded: 390 x 1440, 4.0 in (10 cm), 21:9 ratio, 311 ppi
- Sound: Stereo speakers
- Connectivity: Bluetooth 5.1 Wi-Fi b/g/n/ac/ax 3G/4G/4G LTE
- Data inputs: Sensors: Accelerometer; Barometer; Fingerprint scanner (side-mounted); Pressure sensor; Gyroscope; Hall sensor; Proximity sensor; Magnetometer; RGB Light sensor
- Other: Physical sound volume keys; USB-C

The Royole FlexPai is a foldable smartphone made by the Chinese company Royole. It was the first commercially available foldable smartphone, with a 7.8 inch display that folds outwards. It was first announced at CES 2018 and it started shipping on December of the same year.

== Specifications ==
The Royole FlexPai ships with Android 9.0 "Pie".

The foldable smartphone runs features a single folding AMOLED display, comes with a 4,000 mAh and with a 16MP and 20MP dual-camera on its inner bezel. Aside from that, the phone also comes with a dual-SIM card setup, and features a fingerprint sensor.

== Legacy ==
On December 2, 2019, Escobar Inc released what it called the Escobar Fold 1 smartphone featuring a flexible screen, which ended up being a rebadged Royole FlexPai. Escobar Inc is tied to various scams involving selling smartphones and flamethrowers with Escobar Inc branding without delivering the products to customers.

It was succeeded by the Royole FlexPai 2.

== See also ==
- Samsung Galaxy Note series
- Huawei Mate X
- Motorola Razr (2020)
