= Royole =

Chinese electronic industry

- Industry: Flexible electronics
- Founded: 2012; 14 years ago
- Founder: Bill Liu (Founder, Chairman & CEO)
- Defunct: 18 November 2024
- Fate: Bankruptcy
- Headquarters: Shenzhen, Guangdong, China; Fremont, California, U.S.
- Area served: Worldwide
- Key people: Xiaojun Yu (Director & Vice President); Peng Wei (Vice President); Sam Chi Fai Ng (Vice President of Finance)
- Products: Flexible Displays; Flexible Sensors; Smart Devices
- Website: royole.com

Royole Corporation was a manufacturer of flexible displays and sensors that can be used in a range of human-machine interface products, including foldable smartphones and other smart devices.

== History ==
Royole was founded by Stanford engineering graduates, including current Founder Bill Liu, in 2012.

The company, backed by investors including IDG Capital, AMTD Group and Knight Capital, produces fully flexible displays in volume from its 4.5-million-square-feet quasi-G6 mass production campus in Shenzhen, China.

Royole has offices in Fremont, California, Hong Kong and Shenzhen.

Towards the end of 2020, Royole filed to go public on Shanghai's STAR Market, but withdrew their application shortly after when shareholder structure issues emerged.

== Milestones ==
Royole produced the world's thinnest full-color flexible displays and flexible sensors (2014), the world's first foldable 3D mobile theater (2015), the world's first curved car dashboard based on flexible electronics (2016), the first smart writing pad, RoWrite, based on flexible sensors (2017), the volume production of Royole's quasi-G6 mass production campus for fully flexible displays (2018), and the world's first commercial foldable smartphone, FlexPai™, with a fully flexible display (2018).

In May 2019, Royole partnered with Louis Vuitton to launch the “Canvas of the Future” line of handbags that featured built-in flexible displays. The bags were unveiled at Louis Vuitton's Cruise 2020 runway show in New York City.

In December 2018, Airbus China Innovation Centre (ACCIC) announced a partnership with Royole to explore applications of flexible displays and sensors in aircraft development with an aim to improve cabin safety and increase energy conservation.

== Awards ==
Royole has received international industry awards, including in the Red Dot Awards and International Design Awards, for its technological innovations and fast growth. Royole was named a 2018 VIP Award winner by TWICE Magazine.

== Controversies ==
In December 2021, 10 months after failing to go public on Shanghai's STAR Market, it was reported that Royole has delayed salary payments to employees for months after the money-losing company suffered from tight cashflow. Founder and CEO Liu Zihong held an all-hands meeting on November 30 to update the company's financial situation. Liu said at the meeting that the company was in the process of obtaining financing and expected to receive funds in December, according to some employees. All back salaries would be paid at the end of December or in January, but there was still uncertainty, Liu said.
