= Android 16 =

2025 Android mobile operating system

- Version of the Android operating system

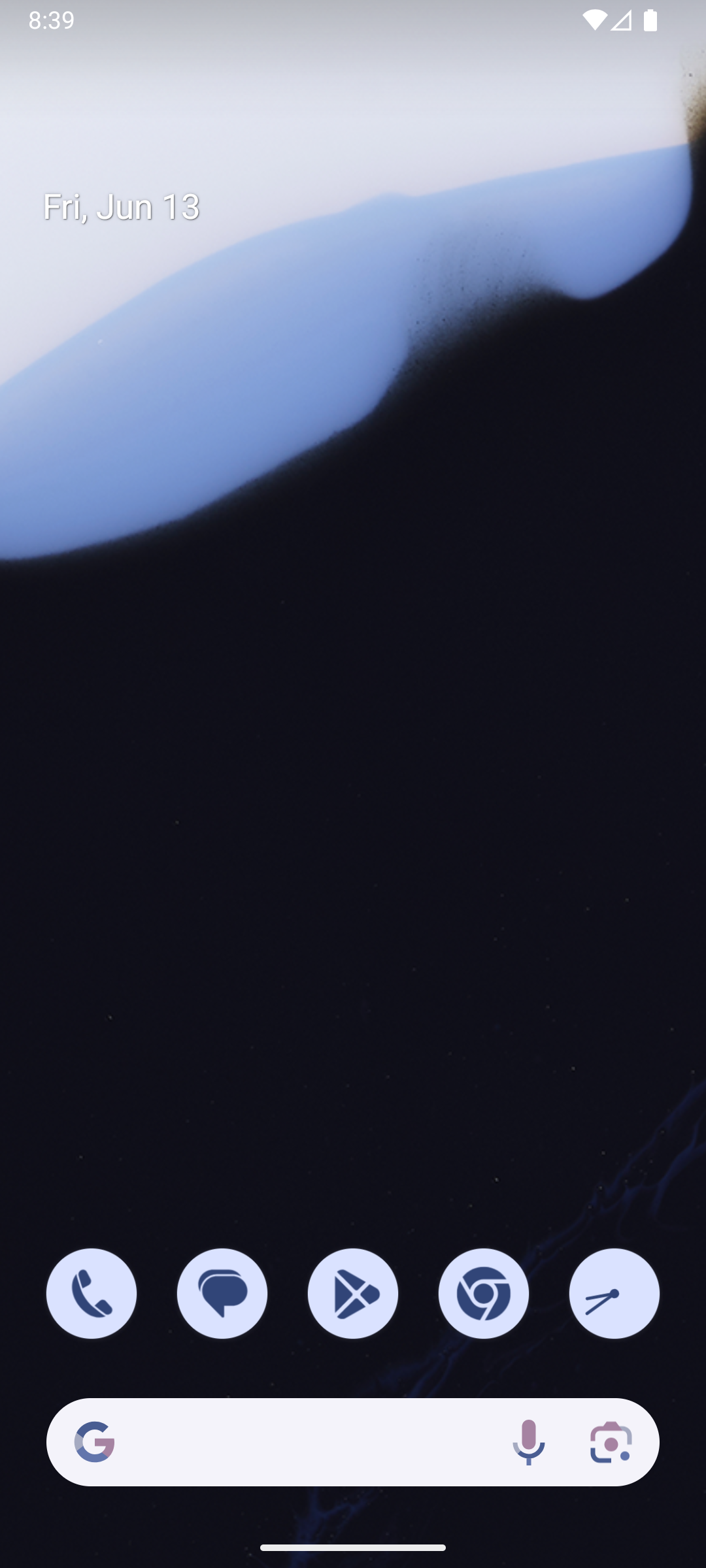
- Android 16 Beta 1 home screen with Pixel Launcher
- Developer: Google
- OS family: Android
- Source model: Open-source software
- Released to manufacturing: January 23, 2025; 21 months ago
- General availability: June 10, 2025; 17 months ago
- Latest release: 16.0.0_r10 (BP2A.250805.053) / November 2, 2026; 10 days ago
- Kernel type: Monolithic (Linux)
- Preceded by: Android 15
- Succeeded by: Android 17
- Official website: android.com/16

Support status
- Supported

Android 16 is the sixteenth major release and the 23rd version of Android, the mobile operating system developed by the Open Handset Alliance and led by Google. The first developer preview was released on November 19, 2024. The first beta was released on January 23, 2025. Google released the final version on June 10, 2025. The first devices to ship with Android 16 are the Samsung Galaxy Z Fold 7, Galaxy Z Flip 7, and its FE model.

As of October 2026, 37.62% of Android devices run Android 16, making it by far the most widely used single version of Android.

== History ==
Android 16's Developer Preview logo

Android 16 is internally codenamed "Baklava". The shift to "Baklava" reflects Google's recent changes in its development approach, particularly its "Trunk Stable Project", which streamlined build processes and naming conventions starting with Android 14. The change came into effect with Android 14 QPR2 builds, with the build IDs for those and Android 15 builds released in 2024 started with the letter A, although the latter's internal codename still followed the older alphabetical sequence. The starting letter was then changed to B in 2025, thus "Baklava" was chosen as the codename to reflect the change.

The first developer preview (DP1) of Android 16 was released on November 19, 2024. A second developer preview was released on December 18, 2024. The first beta was released on January 23, 2025, with the second beta released shortly after on February 13, 2025. The third beta, released on March 13, 2025, marked the platform's stability milestone. The fourth and last scheduled beta of Android 16 was released on April 17, 2025.

Android 16 is based on Linux kernel version 6.12, although some devices still run earlier versions underneath (including versions 6.1 and 6.6 on most Google Pixel devices).

== Features ==
The official release notes state that the following features were introduced in Android 16:

=== User interface ===
Android 16 introduces an overhaul to the operating system's Material Design language, branded as "Material 3 Expressive", which features increased use of animation, colors, and blur. Material 3 Expressive was not included in the initial release of Android 16; in September 2025 it began to be deployed to Pixel phones (Pixel 6 and newer) and the Pixel Tablet.

=== Desktop mode ===
Android 16 introduces a desktop mode for tablets, similar to ChromeOS and Samsung DeX. The desktop mode is not included in the initial release of Android 16 and was instead implemented in September 2025 update to Pixel Tablet.

=== Linux terminal ===
In Android 16, Google expanded the "Linux Terminal" feature, which was initially introduced in Android 15 QPR2 beta, allowing users to run Linux applications within a virtual machine on their devices. This feature utilizes the Android Virtualization Framework (AVF) to create a Debian-based environment where users can execute Linux commands and graphical applications. The guest operating system is fully isolated by the hypervisor (KVM or gunyah) and manages its own resources with its own Linux kernel. Notably, it supports running classic software such as Doom, demonstrating its ability to run full desktop applications.

=== Embedded photo picker ===
The Android photo picker now supports cloud-based media services like Google Photos. Users can seamlessly select photos stored in their cloud accounts, eliminating the need to switch between apps. Additionally, the picker integrates cloud albums alongside local content. The embedded picker can now respond to configuration changes such as screen orientation and theme changes, can hide the overflow menu and preview features, and includes a selection bar and a snack bar that can be expanded or collapsed. Additionally, the picker now includes search functionality, enabling users to search for specific photos and videos within their local and cloud storage.

=== Health records ===
Android 16 introduces enhanced functionality in Health Connect, allowing apps to access and manage medical data through a new set of APIs. The initial developer preview includes support for writing medical records in Fast Healthcare Interoperability Resources (FHIR), a standardized format for managing electronic health records across different healthcare systems. This feature currently focuses on immunization records, with plans to expand support for lab results, medications, and more. Apps can utilize permissions such as android.permission.health.READ_MEDICAL_DATA_IMMUNIZATION and android.permission.health.WRITE_MEDICAL_DATA to interact with this data, with explicit user consent required.

=== Privacy Sandbox on Android ===
This feature limits tracking mechanisms by utilizing anonymized data and local processing to deliver personalized content without compromising user privacy. In April 2025, Google announced end of Privacy Sandbox development and deprecated majority of Privacy Sandbox APIs, including Attribution Reporting, On-Device Personalization, Protected App Signals, Protected Audience, SDK Runtime, and Topics API.

=== Audio sharing ===
Android 16 utilizes Bluetooth LE Audio's Auracast technology. This allows users to stream audio to multiple Bluetooth devices simultaneously, such as headphones or speakers, without complex pairing. To use this feature, both the source device and receiving devices must support Bluetooth LE Audio.

=== Notification cooldown ===
The notification cooldown feature in Android 16 aims to reduce distractions from rapid notification bursts. When multiple notifications are received in quick succession, this feature temporarily lowers the notification sound and minimizes alerts for up to two minutes. This adjustment does not affect priority notifications, such as calls or alarms, allowing users to maintain focus while still receiving critical updates.

=== Adaptive apps ===
To ensure seamless functionality across various devices and screen sizes, Android 16 is removing the ability for apps to restrict screen orientation and resizability on large screens. This change encourages developers to create adaptive apps that adjust fluidly to different display dimensions and orientations. Initially, in 2025, this will affect apps targeting API level 36 on devices with screens wider than 600dp, with an opt-out option available. By 2026, the policy will extend to apps targeting API level 37, eliminating the opt-out provision.

=== Live Updates ===
Android 16 introduces "Live Updates", a new class of notifications designed to help users monitor and quickly access important ongoing activities. The new ProgressStyle notification template provides a consistent user experience for Live Updates, helping developers build progress-centric user journeys such as rideshare, delivery, and navigation. It includes support for custom icons for start, end, and current progress tracking, segments and points, user journey states, milestones, and more.

=== APV codec support ===
Android 16 introduces support for the Advanced Professional Video (APV) codec, designed for professional-level high-quality video recording and post-production. The APV codec standard offers features such as YUV 422 color sampling, 10-bit encoding, and target bitrates of up to 2 Gbit/s. A reference implementation is provided through the OpenAPV project.

=== Vertical text rendering ===
To better support languages that utilize vertical writing systems, such as Mongolian, Android 16 adds low-level support for rendering and measuring text vertically. A new flag, VERTICAL_TEXT_FLAG, has been added to the Paint class. When this flag is set, Paint's text measurement APIs will report vertical advances instead of horizontal ones, and Canvas will draw text vertically.

=== Battery health ===
The battery information screen can show battery health and cycles count on supported smartphones.

== Development ==
Android 16 development began with the release of the first developer preview on November 19, 2024, followed by a second preview on December 18. These early builds introduced initial features, APIs, and behavior changes for developer feedback. The first beta version, released on January 23, 2025, marked the transition to a more stable testing phase. Platform stability was reached with Beta 3 in March, finalizing the APIs and behaviors and allowing developers to publish to the Play Store. The stable release of Android 16 was made available on June 10, 2025, earlier in the year than previous Android versions.

Android 16 also introduced a revised structure for software development kit (SDK) releases. The first SDK, released in March 2025 alongside Beta 3, included new APIs, features, and behavior changes. A second SDK, expected in late 2025, is focused solely on delivering additional APIs and features without altering platform behavior. Google stated that this two-phase approach is intended to accelerate innovation in app and device development.

== Reception ==
In a review for Ars Technica, Ryan Whitwam described Android 16 as "humdrum", noting that it introduced only minimal interface changes, such as revised icons and a few new features. He praised the new Advanced Protection security mode and improvements to large-screen support, which allow apps to scale automatically, though noted that many apps still displayed poorly on foldables and tablets. He said changes to the notification system—including default bundling and a new "progress notification" type—are likely to have the greatest impact on user experience.

== See also ==
- Android version history
