= Foldable smartphone =

Smartphone form factor

Samsung Galaxy Z series foldable smartphones (front view)

Samsung Galaxy Z series foldable smartphones (back view)

A foldable smartphone (also called a foldable phone or simply foldable) is a smartphone with a folding form factor. While folding designs have been used previously in flip phone models, the term "foldable" now generally refers to a newer style featuring flexible displays in which the display itself folds. Some variants of the concept instead use multiple touchscreen panels connected by a hinge.

Various structural layouts exist in this category. Devices may fold horizontally on a vertical hinge (Note: Vertical in this case meaning that the mechanical hinge runs vertically down the middle of the device, not that the screen itself folds vertically (instead that would be horizontal).) into a wider, tablet-like form, which typically use an inward-folding booklet-style design with a smaller screen on the outside cover allowing interaction without opening the device. Some early devices, such as the Huawei Mate X, used an outward-folding design in which a single display would wrap around to the back of the device when folded. A more recent category is the emergence of tri-folds, which contain two hinges rather than one and allowing for even greater display sizes on the interior. Foldable smartphones in a clamshell form factor (folding vertically on a horizontal hinge (Note: Horizontal in this case meaning that the mechanical hinge runs horizontally straight across the center of the smartphone. The screen itself folds vertically downward.)) have also been produced.

Concepts for such devices date back as early as 2008, although the first commercially available folding smartphones with OLED displays began to appear at the end of 2018, namely the Royole FlexPai, while the first mass-market foldable was the Samsung Galaxy Fold released in 2019. The first generation of commercially released foldable smartphones faced concerns over durability and their high prices, and were largely regarded as a gimmick. However, improvements in physical technology have led to improved durability and usability of foldables, with book-style foldables and tri-folds in particular being seen as practical alternatives to the standard "slate" form factor as of 2026. In 2023, only around 1% of worldwide smartphone ownership were foldable smartphones.

== Components ==
=== Display materials ===
Foldable smartphones typically use flexible, plastic OLED displays rather than glass (such as Corning's Gorilla Glass product, which is used in the majority of mid and high-end smartphones). Plastic displays are naturally capable of sustaining the required bend radius for a foldable smartphone, but they are more susceptible to blemishes and scratches than traditional glass smartphone displays. Although Corning does produce a flexible glass product known as Willow Glass, the company states that its manufacturing process requires the use of a salt solution—thus making it unsuitable for electronic displays because the salt can damage the transistors used in OLED panels (which are built directly on the panel). Nonetheless, the company stated in March 2019 that it was in the process of developing a flexible glass suitable for smartphones, which would be 1 mm (0.039 in) thick and have a 5 mm (0.20 in) bend radius.

Samsung marketed its Galaxy Z Flip as featuring 30 μm (0.0012 in)-thick "ultra-thin glass" with a plastic layer similar to the Galaxy Fold, manufactured by Samsung with materials from Schott AG, which is "produced using an intensifying process to enhance its flexibility and durability", and injected with a "special material up to an undisclosed depth to achieve a consistent hardness". A stress test by YouTube channel JerryRigEverything showed the screen was scratched when rubbed with a pick with a Mohs rating of 2 (in comparison, most smartphones tested by the channel begin to experience scratches with 6 and 7-rated picks), placing its durability in line with other folding phones. However, The Verge did note Samsung's statement that the device contained a protective polymer layer similar to that of the Galaxy Fold.

== Types ==
Market analysts typically split the foldable smartphone market into three categories: book-style, clamshell-style, and tri-fold. As of 2025, book-style foldables held a share of 62% of foldable sales. In the early years of foldable smartphones, clamshells had the lead over book-style ones, but the latter has continuously grown to overtake clamshell-style smartphones in sales as of 2025.

Early devices, such as the Huawei Mate X, featured an outward facing folding screen. The prevailing design for most foldable smartphones, regardless of category, is a separate external cover screen, with an internal foldable display.

Category	Sample	Display		Folding axis	
Category	Sample	Exterior (folded)	Interior (unfolded)	Mechanical hinge	Folding motion
Clamshell-style		Small square	Tall phone	Horizontal	Vertical
Book-style		Standard phone	Mini tablet	Vertical	Horizontal
Passport-style		Tiny tablet	Mini tablet	Vertical	Horizontal
Tri-fold		Standard phone	Full-size tablet	Vertical	Horizontal

=== Book-style ===
Book-style foldable smartphones resemble regular smartphones when folded and are opened horizontally like a traditional book. When unfolded, the screen size is comparable to that of a small tablet.

Book-style foldable smartphones vary in size, with most offering a narrow exterior cover screen for one-handed use and a large, almost square interior display. A more recent form factor is a "passport-style" with a wider aspect ratio on the outer screen. The wider display reduces the black bars often seen on taller foldables, as it aligns more closely with the native aspect ratio of most video content.

=== Clamshell-style ===
Clamshell-style foldables feature a standard phone screen that folds vertically along a horizontal axis, folding to a compact square when closed.

=== Tri-fold ===
Tri-fold foldable smartphones are similar to book-style foldables and unfold horizontally but utilize a multi-hinge design that enables folding at multiple points. This design provides a display area comparable to that of a standard tablet.

== History ==
=== Predecessors ===
In 2006, Polymer Vision showed a roll-able concept and a foldable smartphone, the Readius (zh), at the Mobile World Congress (MWC) which also serves as a reader.

In 2008, Nokia presented animated concepts of a flexible device it dubbed "Morph", which had a tri-fold design that could be bent into various forms, such as a large unfolded device, a feature phone-sized unit, and a smart wristband. In a 2019 retrospective on the concept, CNET noted that Morph could be considered a forerunner to the first wave of commercially produced folding phones, as well as a showcase of future possibilities.

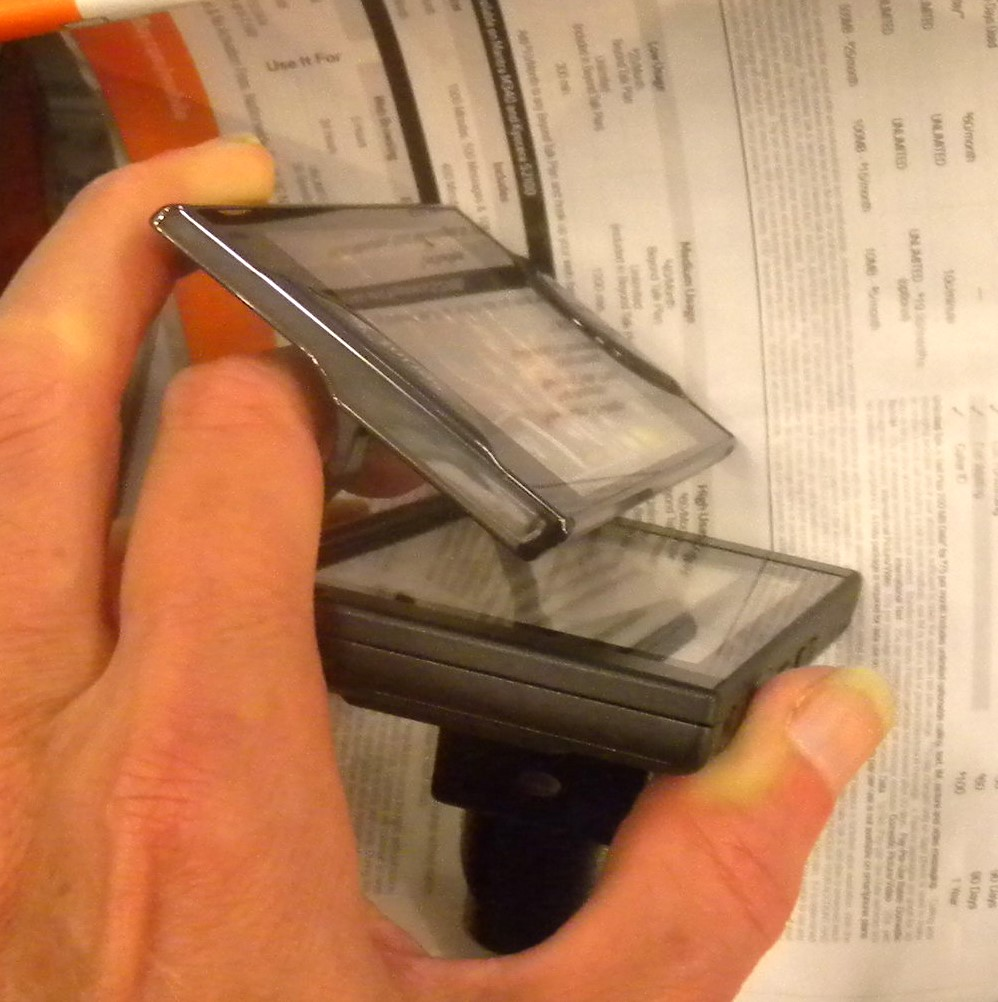
The Kyocera Echo is a precursor to the current generation of foldable smartphones

In 2011, Kyocera released a dual-touchscreen Android smartphone known as the Echo, which featured a pair of 3.5-inch touchscreens. When folded, the top screen continued to face the user while covering the secondary screen. Two individual apps could be shown on the displays, a single app could span across them, while specific apps also featured "optimized" two-pane layouts. Two years later, NEC released the Medias W in Japan. Unlike the Echo, the secondary screen could be folded behind the phone. The camera rotated with the screen so that the same sensor could face both forward and rear In 2017, ZTE released the Axon M with a similar hinge to the Medias W. ZTE stated that the more powerful hardware of modern smartphones, and improvements to multitasking and tablet support on Android, helped to improve this experience.

The development of thin, flexible OLED displays enabled the possibility for new designs and form factors. During its Consumer Electronics Show keynote in 2013, Samsung presented several concepts (codenamed Youm) for smartphones incorporating flexible displays. One such concept was a smartphone that could fold outward into a single, uninterrupted tablet-sized display. The first Youm concept to make it to a production model was the Galaxy Note Edge, a phablet with a portion of the screen that sloped over the right-hand bezel.

=== Emergence ===
Speculation surrounding the development of folding phones using OLED displays began to emerge more rapidly in 2018. In January 2018, it was reported that LG Electronics had obtained a design patent for a folding smartphone. Later in June, it was reported that Microsoft had been developing a similar device as part of its Surface line, codenamed "Andromeda" (itself considered a spiritual successor to a dual-screen booklet tablet prototype Microsoft had been exploring in the late-2000s known as Courier), while Samsung was also said to be developing such a device. Other companies expressed interest in the concept, or have received patents on designs (such as hinge implementations and overall designs) relating to foldable phones. Motorola Mobility had received patents for a horizontal folding smartphone reminiscent of clamshell feature phones.

In November 2018, the Chinese startup Royole released the first commercially available foldable smartphone with an OLED display, the Royole Flexpai. It featured a single 7.8-inch display that folds outwards, leaving the display exposed when folded. Later that month at its developers' conference, Samsung officially teased a prototype of its folding smartphone, which would be produced "in the coming months". The prototype used a booklet-style layout, with an "InfinityFlex" display located on the inside of the device, and a smaller "cover" screen on the front of the device to allow access when the screen is closed. At a concurrent developers' summit, Android VP of engineering Dave Burke stated that the next version of the platform would provide enhancements and guidance relevant to folding devices, leveraging existing features.

In January 2019, Xiaomi CEO Lin Bin published a video on Sina Weibo, featuring him demonstrating a prototype smartphone with two flaps capable of being folded inward. Samsung officially unveiled the Galaxy Fold during its media event at Mobile World Congress in February 2019. Alongside the Galaxy Fold, the convention also saw other foldable phones being unveiled or teased, such as the Huawei Mate X, and TCL presenting various prototype concepts featuring its "DragonHinge" technology (including a bracelet-styled device).

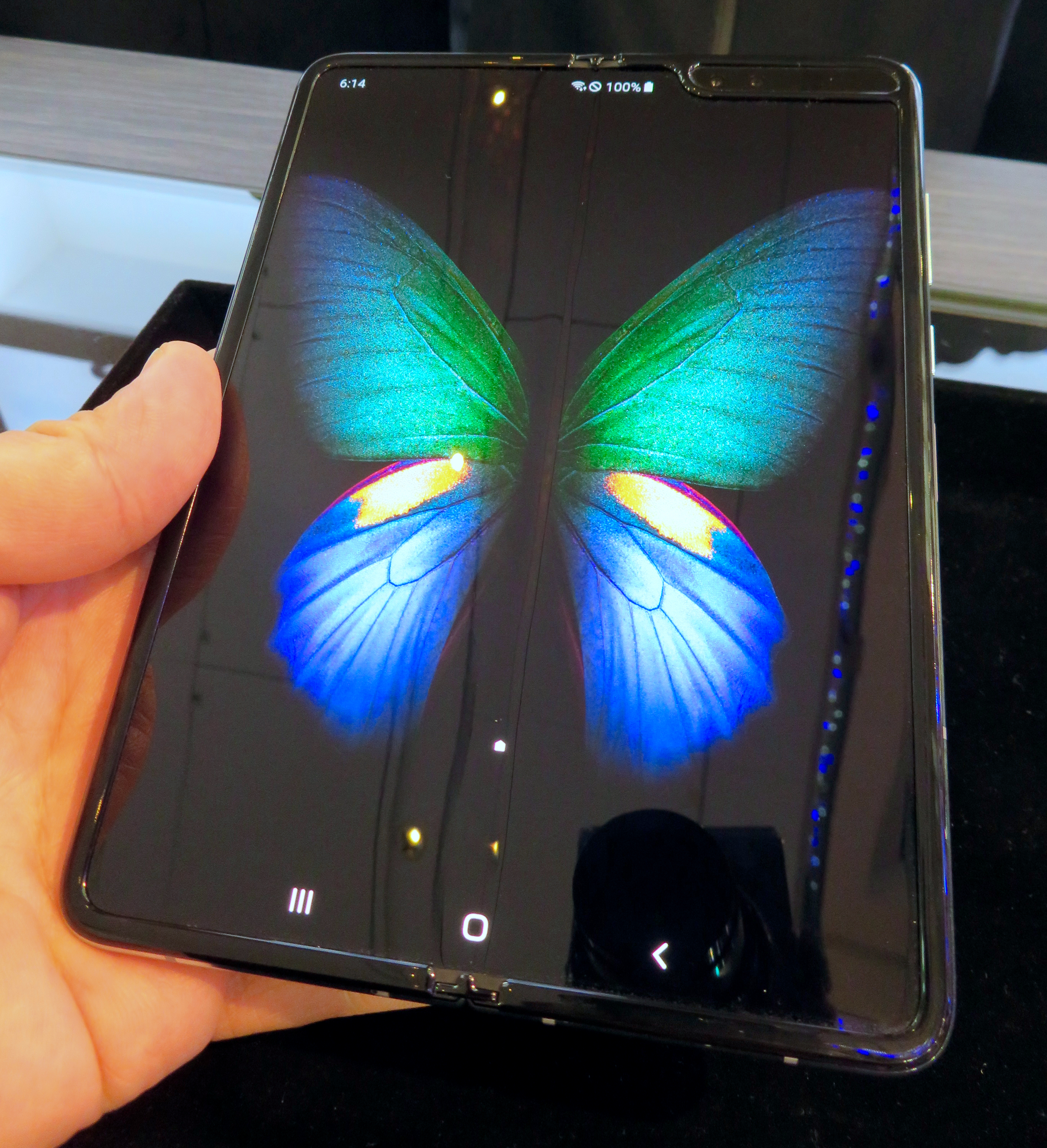
An open Samsung Galaxy Fold

In April 2019, the impending launch of the Galaxy Fold was met with quality concerns from critics, after widespread reports of review units experiencing varying forms of display failure (in some instances caused by accidental removal of a plastic layer meant to protect the screen in lieu of glass, along with other failures). Samsung indefinitely postponed the device's release, stating that it needed time to investigate the failures and improve the device's durability. Huawei also delayed its Huawei Mate X, with the company citing its desire to take a "cautious" approach due to the Samsung Galaxy Fold. These led to public scepticism regarding the durability of these cutting-edge foldable devices, especially with their high price points. Samsung's Galaxy Fold was eventually released in September 2019 as the first mass-market foldable smartphone, followed shortly thereafter by Huawei's Mate X in China only.

In November 2019, Motorola Mobility unveiled its Razr foldable smartphone, inspired by its former Razr feature phone line, with a clamshell-style design. Samsung also announced a similar device known as the Galaxy Z Flip. These used the foldable display technology in a different vertical-moving layout and thus effectively a modern take of the characteristic 2000s flip phone.

=== Further developments ===
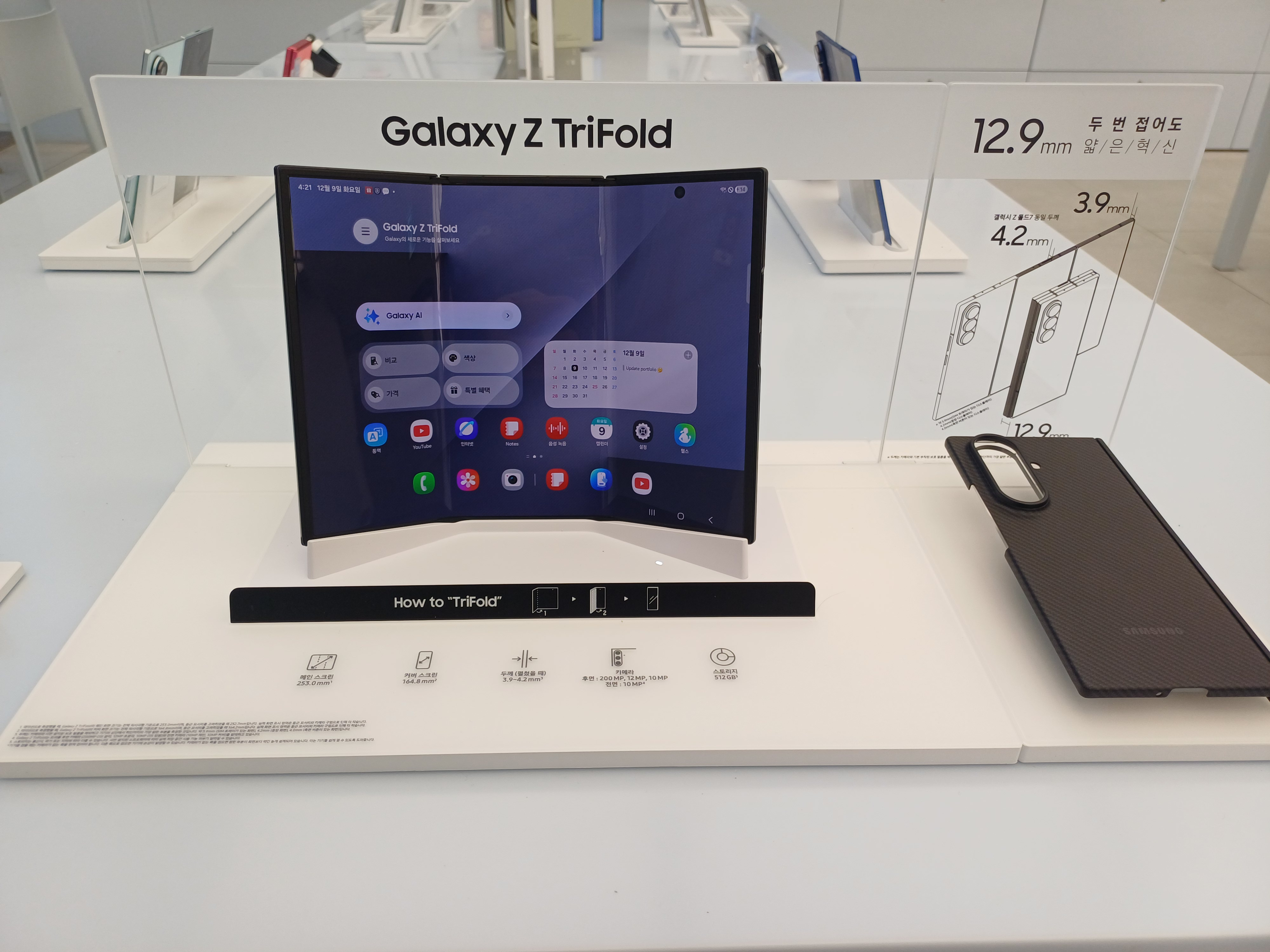
The Samsung Galaxy Z TriFold

In spite of durability concerns at the beginning, manufactures have claimed improvements as a result of improved hinges and other components. In many book-style foldables, wedge gaps have been reduced or eliminated partly by "waterdrop" hinges. The adoption of thin glass displays after 2020 has also helped durability by not falling for dust particles going inside the display. In clamshell foldables, external cover screens have expanded from tiny notification strips to larger displays which on some models are usable for certain apps and tasks without having to unfold the device.

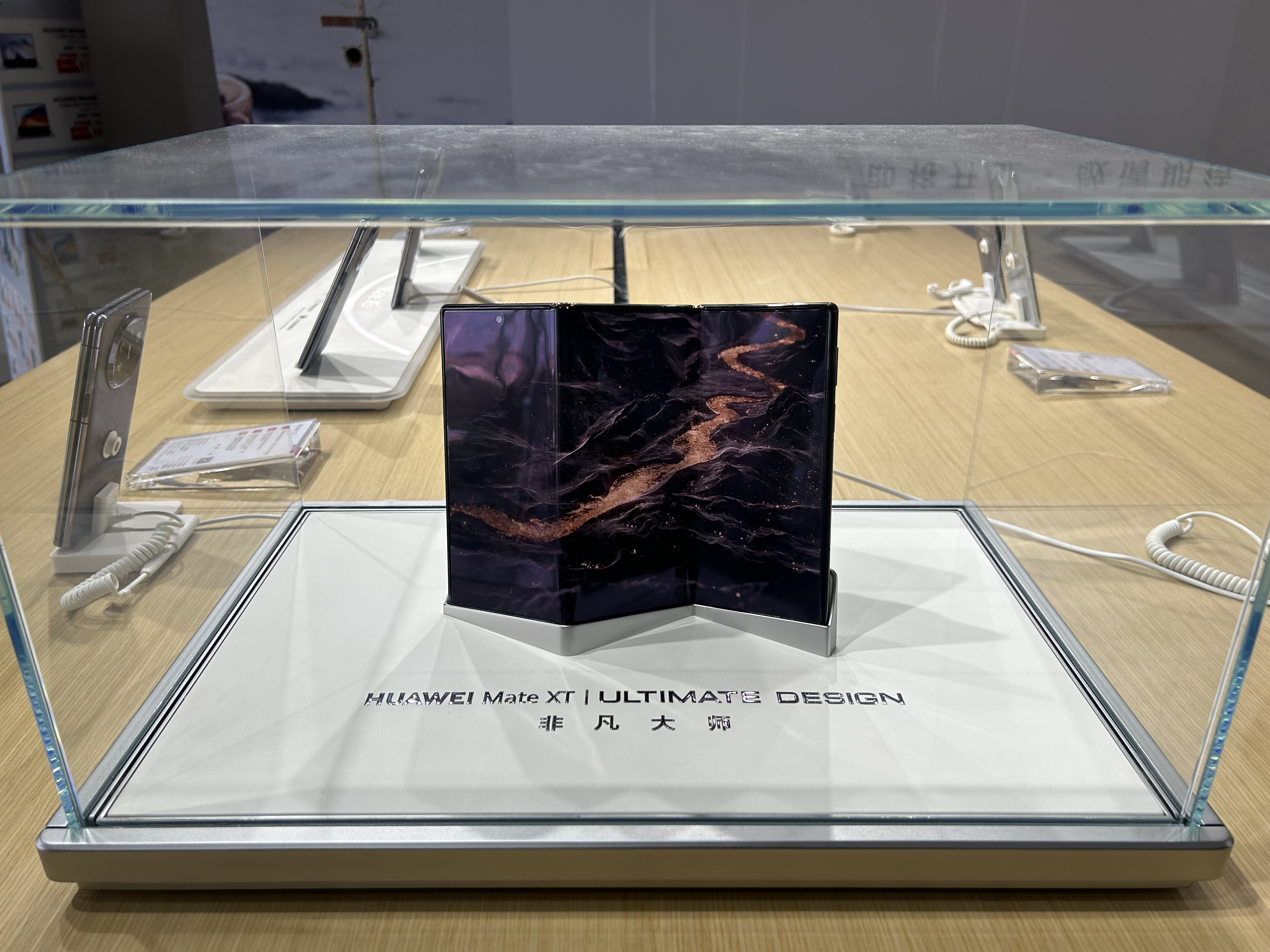
A half open Huawei Mate XT Ultimate Design

In September 2024, the Huawei Mate XT was introduced as the first double-folding, or tri-fold smartphone. The device can be used with a case that has a kickstand, and a foldable keyboard with a built in trackpad to provide a desktop computer-like experience. On 1 December 2025, Samsung announced their Samsung Galaxy Z TriFold, a tri-folding smartphone. Both these devices are part of an entirely new category of foldables that expand the book-style form further to make full-sized tablet screen sizes possible. In September 2026, Apple introduced the iPhone Duo, its first foldable smartphone with a book-style form factor.

The iPhone Duo launching at Apple Store TRX

== Popularity and manufacturers ==
Globally, Samsung Electronics, Huawei and Motorola Mobility are the three largest vendors of foldable smartphones. As of 2026, Huawei is the single largest manufacturer and is particularly dominant in its home country China; Huawei and Honor dominate the Chinese foldable smartphone market with 81% of sales. Motorola is the largest vendor of foldable smartphones overall in the US and Latin America and ranks second behind Samsung in Europe. Flip phone foldables on the other hand have been continuously dominated by only two manufacturers: Samsung and Motorola (Galaxy Z Flip and Razr lines respectively). However, Huawei and Honor maintain a stronger presence in Chinese and Southeast Asian markets.

=== Userbase ===
User analysis suggest that book-style foldables are popular among productivity workers and partly driven by multitasking and documents. Clamshell-style foldables find higher popularity among younger people with emphasis on fashion and compactness. Tri-fold foldables are expected to target a luxury market with both mobile workstation and widescreen gaming and cinematic entertainment usage.

=== Full list of vendors ===
The following vendors have commercially released and marketed at least one foldable smartphone:

- (United States) Apple
- (United States) Google
- (China) Honor
- (China) Huawei
- (Hong Kong) Infinix
- (United States) Motorola
- (China) Nubia
- (China) OnePlus
- (China) Oppo
- (China) Royole
- (South Korea) Samsung
- (Hong Kong) Tecno
- (Hong Kong) Vertu
- (China) Vivo
- (China) Xiaomi
- (China) ZTE

== See also ==
- Laptop
