= Samsung Galaxy S23 =

2023 flagship smartphones by Samsung Electronics

Samsung Galaxy S23 series

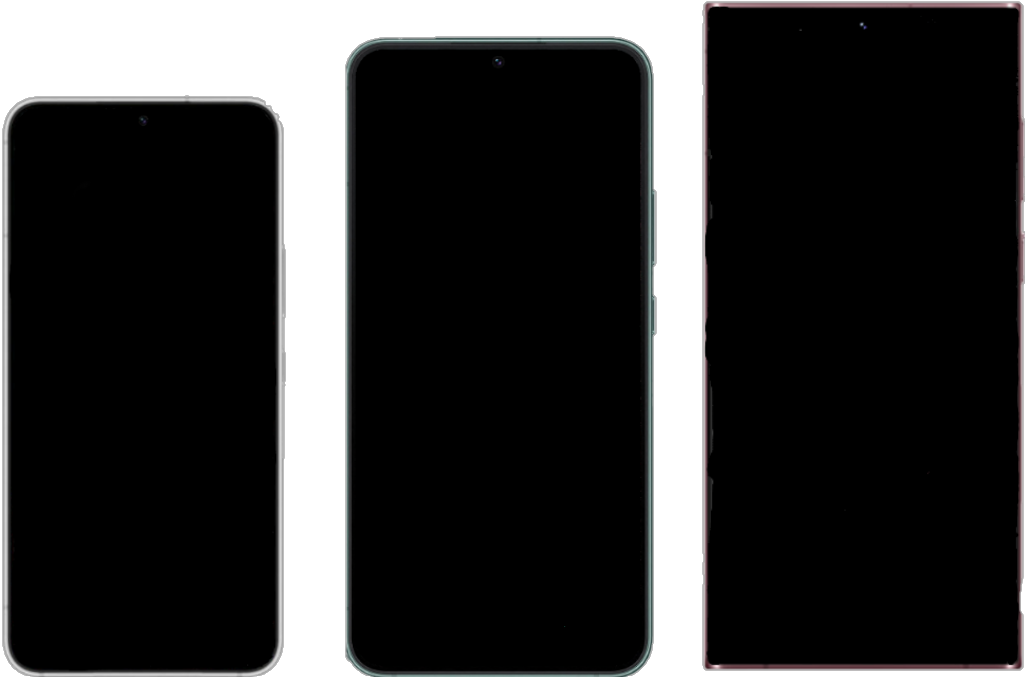
- S23 (left), S23+ (center), S23 Ultra (right)
- Brand: Samsung
- Manufacturer: Samsung Electronics
- Type: Smartphone
- Series: Galaxy S
- Family: Samsung Galaxy
- First released: S23, S23+ and S23 Ultra: February 1, 2023; 3 years ago S23 FE: October 3, 2023; 3 years ago
- Availability by region: S23, S23+ and S23 Ultra: February 17, 2023; 3 years ago S23 FE: October 26, 2023; 3 years ago
- Discontinued: S23, S23+ and S23 Ultra: January 17, 2024; 2 years ago S23 FE: September 26, 2024; 2 years ago
- Predecessor: Samsung Galaxy S21 FE (for S23 FE); Samsung Galaxy S22; Samsung Galaxy A73 5G (for S23 FE)
- Successor: Samsung Galaxy S24
- Related: Samsung Galaxy Z Fold 5 Samsung Galaxy Z Flip 5
- Compatible networks: 2G / 3G / 4G LTE / 5G NR
- Form factor: Slate
- Colors: S23 and S23+: Cream, Lavender; S23 Ultra: Green, Phantom Black; S23 FE: Graphite, Mint, Purple
- Dimensions: S23: 146.3×70.9×7.6 mm (5.76×2.79×0.30 in); S23+: 157.8×76.2×7.6 mm (6.21×3.00×0.30 in); S23 Ultra: 163.4×78.1×8.9 mm (6.43×3.07×0.35 in); S23 FE: 158×76.5×8.2 mm (6.2×3.01×0.32 in)
- Weight: S23: 168 g (5.9 oz); S23+: 195 g (6.9 oz); S23 Ultra: 233 g (8.2 oz); S23 FE: 209 g (7.4 oz)
- Operating system: Original: S23, S23+ and S23 Ultra / S23 FE (Global): Android 13 with One UI 5.1; S23 FE (Korea & Japan): Android 14 with One UI 6.0; Current: Android 17 with One UI 9.0
- System-on-chip: S23, S23+ and S23 Ultra: Qualcomm Snapdragon 8 Gen 2 for Galaxy; S23 FE (International): Samsung Exynos 2200; S23 FE (USA): Qualcomm Snapdragon 8 Gen 1
- CPU: S23, S23+ and S23 Ultra: Octa-Core (1x3.36 GHz Cortex-X3 & 2x2.8 GHz Cortex-A715 & 2x2.8 GHz Cortex-A710 & 3x2.0 GHz Cortex-A510); S23 FE (International): Octa-core (1x2.8 GHz Cortex-X2 & 3x2.5 GHz Cortex-A710 & 4x1.8 GHz Cortex-A510); S23 FE (USA): Octa-core (1x3 GHz Cortex-X2 & 3x2.5 GHz Cortex-A710 & 4x1.8 GHz Cortex-A510)
- GPU: S23, S23+ and S23 Ultra: Adreno 740 @ 719 MHz; S23 FE (International): Xclipse 920; S23 FE (USA): Adreno 730
- Memory: 8 or 12 GB LPDDR5X RAM
- Storage: S23: 128, 256 or 512 GB; S23+: 256 or 512 GB; S23 Ultra: 256, 512 GB or 1 TB; S23 FE: 128 GB
- SIM: Nano-SIM and eSIM
- Battery: S23: Li-ion 3900 mAh; S23+: Li-ion 4700 mAh; S23 Ultra: Li-ion 5000 mAh; S23 FE: Li-ion 4500 mAh
- Charging: S23 and S23 FE: "Super fast charging" at 25W; S23+ and S23 Ultra: "Super fast charging 2.0" at 45W; All: Qi wireless charging at 15W
- Rear camera: S23 and S23+: 50 MP, f/1.8, 23mm (wide); 10 MP, f/2.4, 70mm (telephoto); 12 MP, f/2.2, 13mm (ultrawide); S23 Ultra: 200 MP, f/1.7, 23mm (wide); 10 MP, f/4.9, 230mm (periscope telephoto); 10 MP, f/2.4, 70mm (telephoto); 12 MP, f/2.2, 13mm (ultrawide); S23 FE: 50 MP, f/1.8, 24mm (wide); 8 MP, f/2.4, 75mm (telephoto); 12 MP, f/2.2, 123˚ (ultrawide)
- Front camera: 12 MP, f/2.2, 25mm (wide)
- Display: Dynamic AMOLED 2X, Infinity-O, capacitive touchscreen, HDR10+, 1 billion colors, 1750 nits (peak), Diamond PenTile; S23: 6.1 in (150 mm) 2340 × 1080 (425 ppi), 19.5:9 aspect ratio, 120 Hz refresh rate; S23+: 6.6 in (170 mm) 2340 × 1080 (393 ppi), 19.5:9 aspect ratio, 120 Hz; S23 Ultra: 6.8 in (170 mm) 3088 × 1440 (500 ppi), 19.3:9 aspect ratio, 120 Hz LTPO; S23 FE: 6.4 in (160 mm) 2340 × 1080 (403 ppi), 19.5:9 aspect ratio, 120 Hz refresh rate
- Sound: Dolby Atmos stereo speakers
- Connectivity: Wi-Fi 802.11 a/b/g/n/ac/ax, tri-band, Wi-Fi Direct, hotspot Bluetooth 5.3, A2DP, LE
- Data inputs: S Pen stylus (S23 Ultra); Accelerometer; Barometer; Fingerprint scanner (under display, ultrasonic); Pressure sensor; Magnetometer; Gyroscope; Hall sensor; Proximity sensor; RGB light sensor; Dual band GNSS (GPS/GLONASS/BeiDou/Galileo)
- Water resistance: IP68 water/dust resistance (Note: Water resistance rated for up to 1.5 m for 30 minutes)
- Website: Galaxy S23 & S23+ Galaxy S23 Ultra; Galaxy S23 FE

The Samsung Galaxy S23 is a series of high-end Android-based smartphones manufactured, developed, produced, and marketed by Samsung Electronics as part of its flagship Galaxy S series. The phones were announced and unveiled on February 1, 2023, at the Galaxy Unpacked in-person event, while the Galaxy S23 FE (alongside the Galaxy Tab S9 FE/FE+ and the Galaxy Buds FE) was unveiled on October 3, 2023. They collectively serve as the successor to the Samsung Galaxy S22 series and the S21 FE. The S23, S23+ and S23 Ultra were the first to be released on February 17, 2023 while the S23 FE was released subsequently on October 26, 2023.

The Galaxy S23 series was succeeded by the Galaxy S24 series, which was announced on January 17, 2024.

== Lineup ==
=== Dimensions ===
The Galaxy S23 series includes three devices, which share the same lineup and screen sizes with the previous Galaxy S22 series. The entry-level Galaxy S23 features a flat 6.1-inch (155 mm) display. The Galaxy S23+ features similar hardware in a larger 6.6-inch (168 mm) form factor, faster charging rate and larger battery capacity. At the top of the lineup, the Galaxy S23 Ultra features a curved 6.8-inch (173 mm) display with the largest battery capacity in the lineup.

=== Performance ===
Unlike the Samsung Galaxy S22 and previous generations, which in some African and all European and Latin American countries utilized Samsung's own Exynos chip, the Galaxy S23 series uses the Qualcomm's Snapdragon 8 Gen 2 for Galaxy chip in all countries, a first for the series.

The Qualcomm Snapdragon 8 Gen 2 for Galaxy, which is a special version of the Snapdragon 8 Gen 2 developed specifically for Samsung, includes an Octa-Core CPU and an Adreno 740 GPU with a Qualcomm X70 modem for connectivity. The difference between the regular version of the Snapdragon 8 Gen 2 compared to the Samsung version is that the Samsung version features an overclocked Cortex-X3 core at 3.36 GHz instead of 3.20 GHz, and the Adreno 740 GPU has been overclocked to 719 MHz instead of 680 MHz.

== Design ==
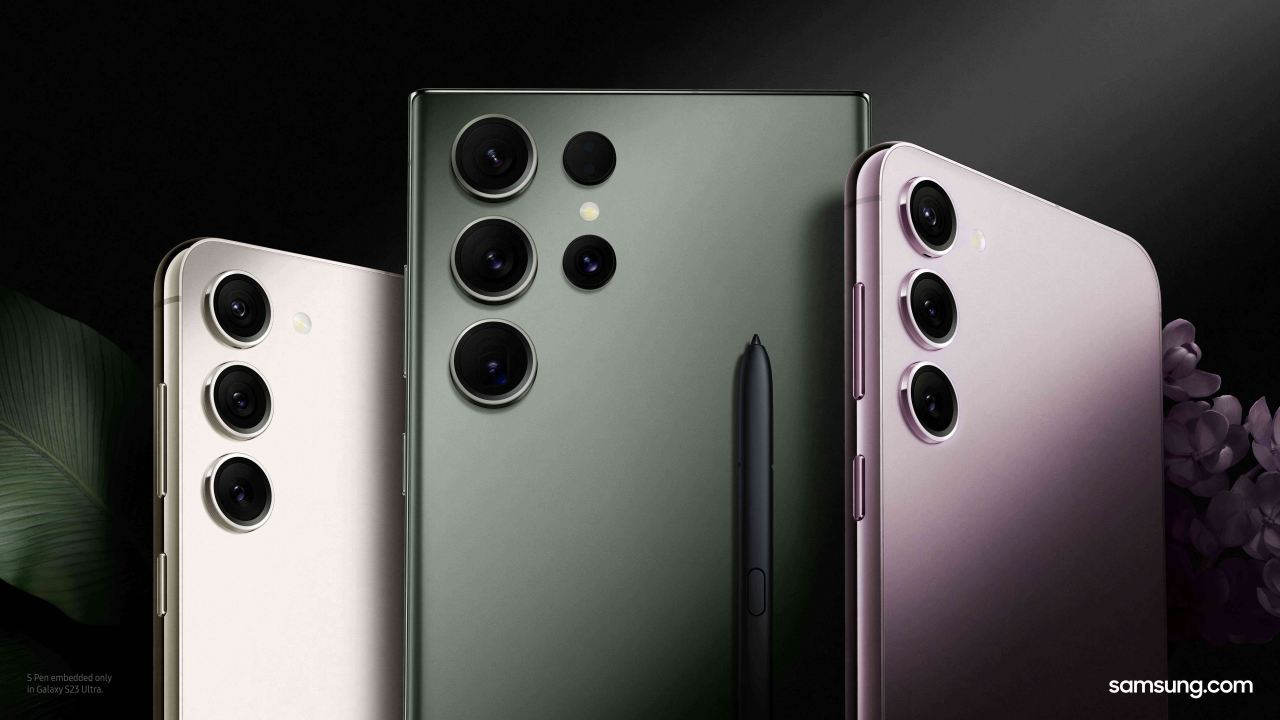
Back of the Samsung Galaxy S23 Cream (left), S23 Ultra Green (center), and S23+ Lavender (right)

All models in the Samsung Galaxy S23 series are available in four standard colors: Cream, Lavender, Green, and Phantom Black, with four additional colors available only at samsung.com: Graphite and Lime, and the Galaxy S23 Ultra exclusives Red and Sky Blue.

	Galaxy S23 FE	Galaxy S23 and S23+	Galaxy S23 Ultra
Base colors	Graphite; Cream; Purple; Mint	Phantom Black; Cream; Green; Lavender	Phantom Black; Cream; Green; Lavender; BMW M Edition
Online exclusive colors	Indigo; Tangerine	Graphite; Lime	Graphite with black frame; Lime with silver frame; Sky Blue with silver frame; Red with black frame

== Specifications ==
=== Hardware ===
==== Display ====
The Galaxy S23 series features a "Dynamic AMOLED 2X" display with HDR10+ support, 1450 nits of peak brightness on the Galaxy S23 FE and 1750 nits of peak brightness on other models, and "dynamic tone mapping" technology. The Galaxy S23, S23+ and S23 Ultra use an ultrasonic in-screen fingerprint sensor, while the Galaxy S23 FE uses an optical in-screen fingerprint sensor.

Spec	Galaxy S23	Galaxy S23+	Galaxy S23 Ultra	Galaxy S23 FE
Display size	6.1 in (155 mm)	6.6 in (168 mm)	6.8 in (173 mm)	6.4 in (163 mm)
Resolution	2340×1080		3120×1440	2340×1080
Density	~425 ppi	~393 ppi	~500 ppi	~403 ppi
Aspect ratio	19.5:9			19.3:9
Max refresh rate	120 Hz			
Variable refresh rate	48 Hz to 120 Hz		1 Hz to 120 Hz	60 Hz to 120 Hz
Panel	Dynamic AMOLED 2X, HDR10+			
Cover glass	Gorilla Glass Victus 2			Gorilla Glass 5

==== Cameras ====
The Galaxy S23 and S23+ have a 50 MP wide sensor, a 10 MP telephoto sensor and a 12 MP ultrawide sensor. The S23 Ultra has a 200 MP wide sensor, two 10 MP telephoto sensors and a 12 MP ultrawide sensor. The front camera uses a 12 MP sensor on all three models.

Camera comparison on the Galaxy S23 series
Models	Galaxy S23 FE	Galaxy S23 & S23+	Galaxy S23 Ultra
Wide	50 MP (f/1.8)		200 MP (f/1.7)
Ultrawide	12 MP (f/2.2)	12 MP (f/2.2)	12 MP (f/2.2) Dual Pixel PDAF
Telephoto	8 MP (3x)	10 MP (3x)	10 MP (3x)
Periscope Telephoto	–		10 MP (10x)
Front	10 MP (f/2.4)	12 MP (f/2.2)	
All models support 8K video recording at up to 30 fps.

==== Batteries ====
The Galaxy S23, S23+, S23 Ultra, and S23 FE contain non-removable 3,900 mAh, 4,700 mAh, 5,000 mAh, and 4,500 mAh Li-ion batteries respectively. The S23 and S23 FE support wired charging over USB-C at up to 25W (using USB Power Delivery) while the S23+ and S23 Ultra have faster 45W charging, branded by Samsung as "Super Fast Charging 2.0". All three have Qi inductive charging up to 15W. The phones also have the ability to charge other Qi-compatible devices from the S23's own battery power, which is branded as "Wireless PowerShare," at up to 4.5W.

	Galaxy S23	Galaxy S23+	Galaxy S23 Ultra	Galaxy S23 FE
Battery capacity	3,900 mAh	4,700 mAh	5,000 mAh	4,500 mAh
Wired charging speed	25 W	45 W		25 W
Qi2 wireless charging speed	15 W			
Reverse wireless charging speed	4.5 W			
Ref.				

==== Memory and storage ====
The Samsung Galaxy S23 and Galaxy S23 FE offer 8 GB of RAM with 128 GB, 256 GB, and, in some regions, 512 GB of internal storage options on the Galaxy S23. The Galaxy S23+ offers 8 GB of RAM with 256 GB and 512 GB of internal storage options. The Galaxy S23 Ultra has 8 GB or 12 GB of RAM and 256 GB, 512 GB, and 1 TB of internal storage options.

The 128 GB versions of the Galaxy S23 and Galaxy S23 FE use the older UFS 3.1 storage format, while versions with 256 GB and more use the newer, faster and more efficient UFS 4.0.

Model	Memory	Storage options	Storage type
Galaxy S23	8 GB	128 GB / 256 GB / 512 GB	UFS 3.1 (128 GB); UFS 4.0 (256/512 GB)
Galaxy S23+	8 GB	256 GB / 512 GB	UFS 4.0
Galaxy S23 Ultra	8 GB / 12 GB	256 GB / 512 GB / 1 TB	UFS 4.0
Galaxy S23 FE	8 GB	128 GB / 256 GB	UFS 3.1
Ref.			

==== Connectivity ====
Samsung Galaxy S23, S23+, and S23 Ultra support 5G SA/NSA/Sub6, Wi-Fi 6E, and Bluetooth 5.3 connectivity.

=== Software ===
The Samsung Galaxy S23 phones were released with Android 13 with Samsung's One UI 5.1 software. Samsung Knox is included for enhanced device security, and a separate version exists for enterprise use. Alongside the Galaxy Z Fold 5, Galaxy Z Flip 5 and Galaxy Tab S9 series, they are the last Samsung flagships to support 32-bit applications and are set to receive 4 OS upgrades and 5 years of security updates (support ending within 2028). It also marks the last time these devices will receive this level of support, as its successors all had 7 years of support.

	Pre-installed OS	OS Upgrades history				End of support
	Pre-installed OS	1st	2nd	3rd	4th	End of support
S23; S23+ S23 Ultra	Android 13 (One UI 5.1)	Android 14 (One UI 6.0); November/December 2023 (One UI 6.1); March 2024 (One UI 6.1.1); September 2024	Android 15 (One UI 7.0); April 2025	Android 16 (One UI 8.0); September 2025 (One UI 8.5); May 2026	Android 17 (One UI 9.0); October 2026	Within 2028
S23 FE	Android 13 (One UI 5.1)	Android 14 (One UI 6.0); November/December 2023 (One UI 6.1); March 2024 (One UI 6.1.1); September 2024	Android 15 (One UI 7.0); April 2025	Android 16 (One UI 8.0); September 2025 (One UI 8.5); May 2026	Android 17 (One UI 9.0); October 2026	Within 2028

== Gallery ==
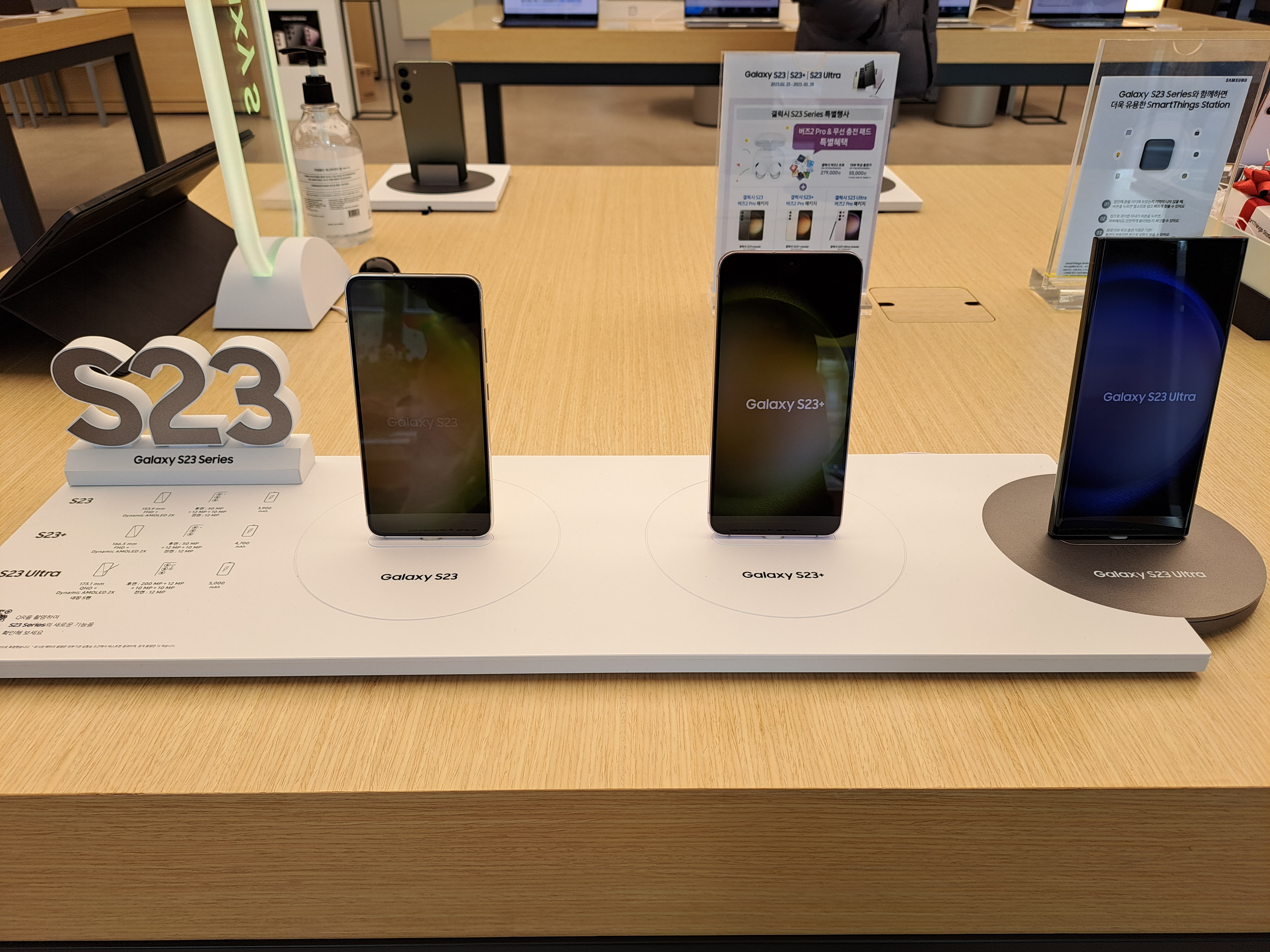
Samsung Galaxy S23 series

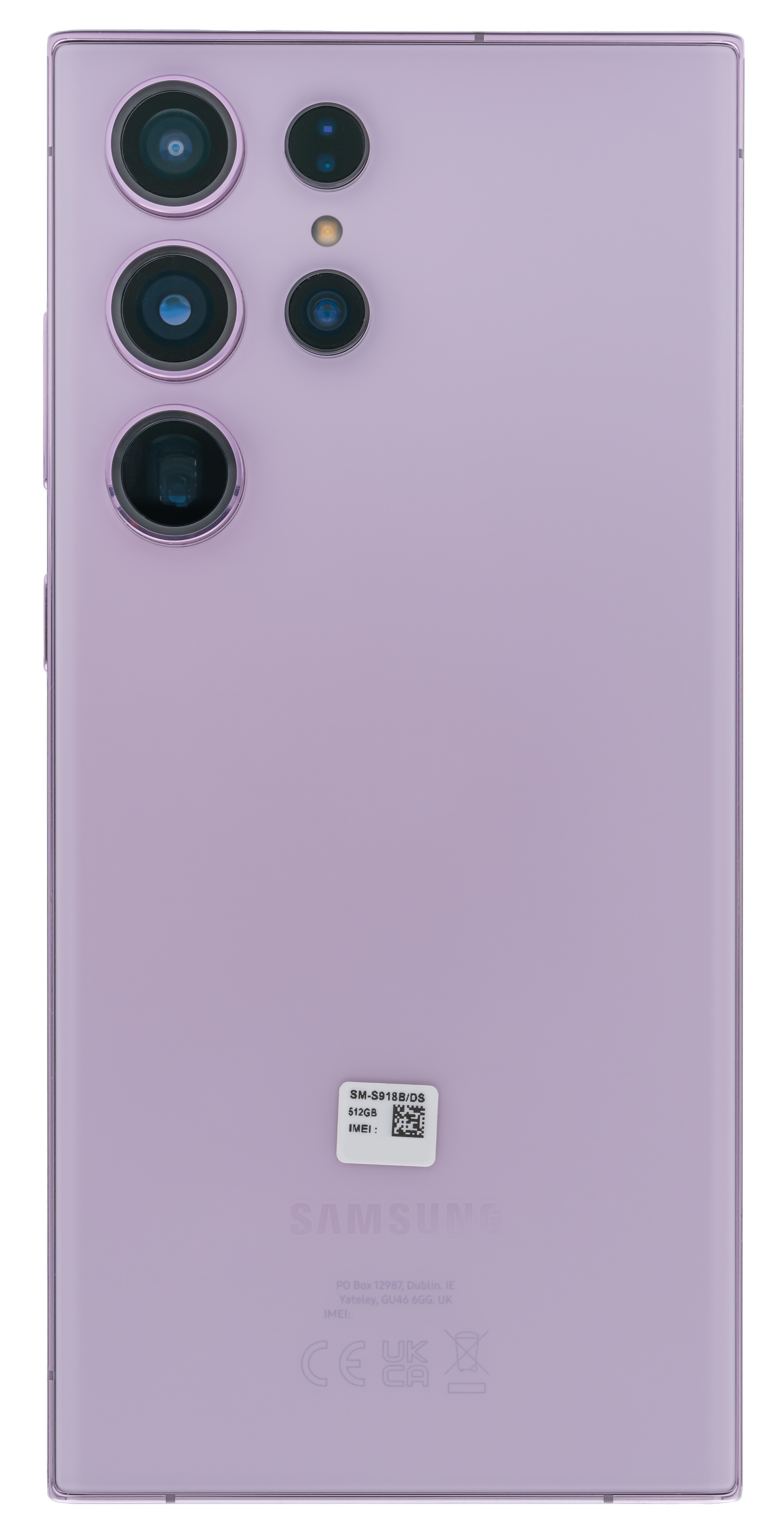
Back view of the Samsung Galaxy S23 Ultra

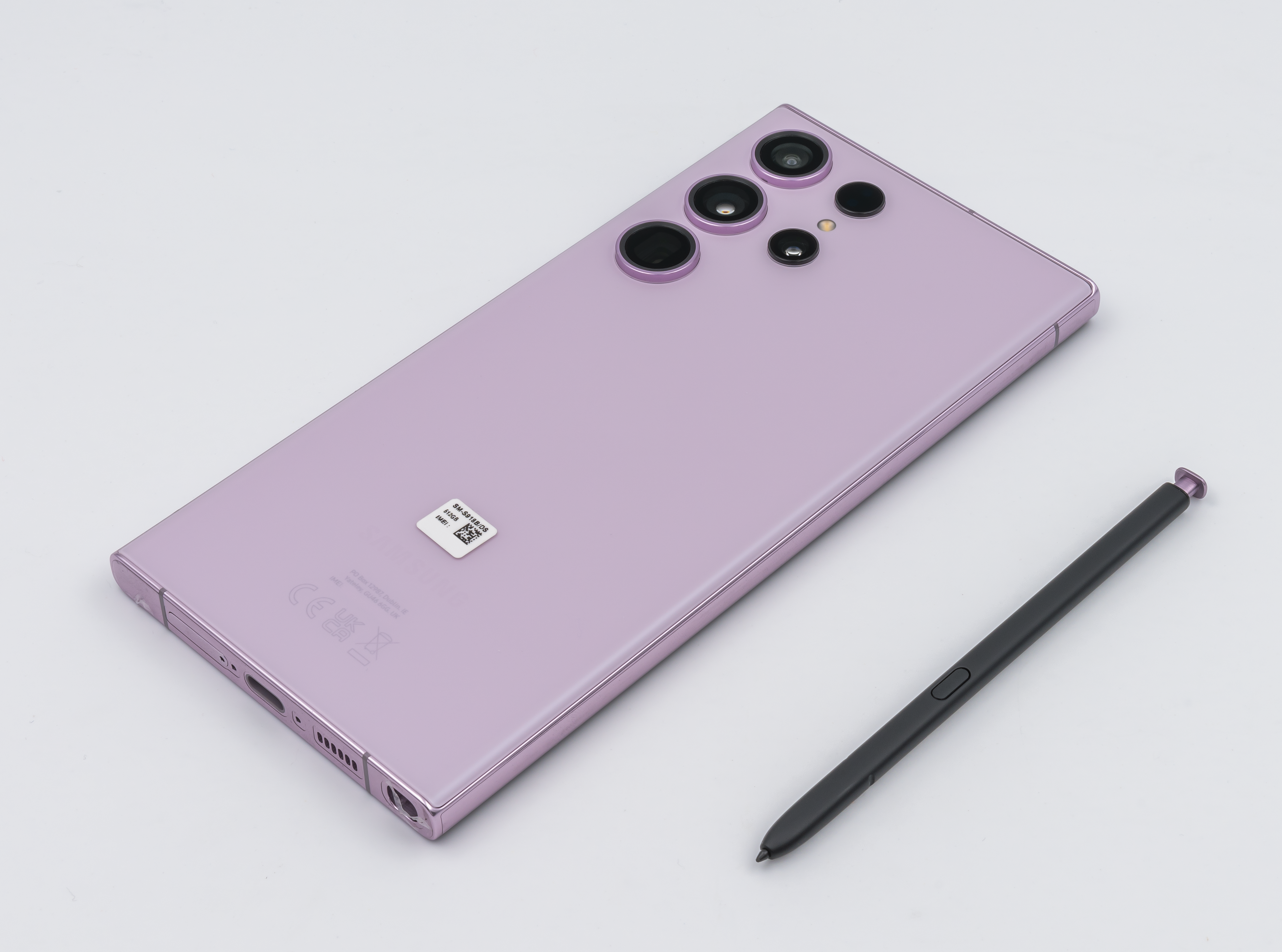
S23 Ultra with its S Pen

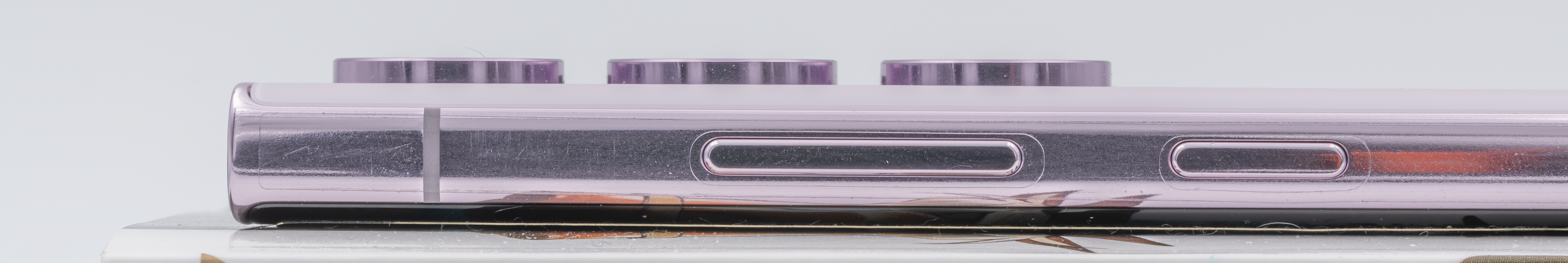
The protruding cameras of the S23 Ultra

== Reception ==
According to IGN, the Galaxy S23 Ultra "truly delivers on every aspect of a premium Android phone", praising its display, performance, camera, and battery life, while criticizing its high price. The Verge's review praised the S23 Ultra for its "exceptional performance", but criticized the high price and lack of "groundbreaking new features".

== See also ==
- Comparison of Samsung Galaxy S smartphones
- List of longest smartphone telephoto lenses

== Notes ==
Preceded by Samsung Galaxy S22	Samsung Galaxy S23; 2023	Succeeded by Samsung Galaxy S24
