= Samsung Galaxy S24 =

2024 flagship smartphones by Samsung Electronics

Samsung Galaxy S24 series

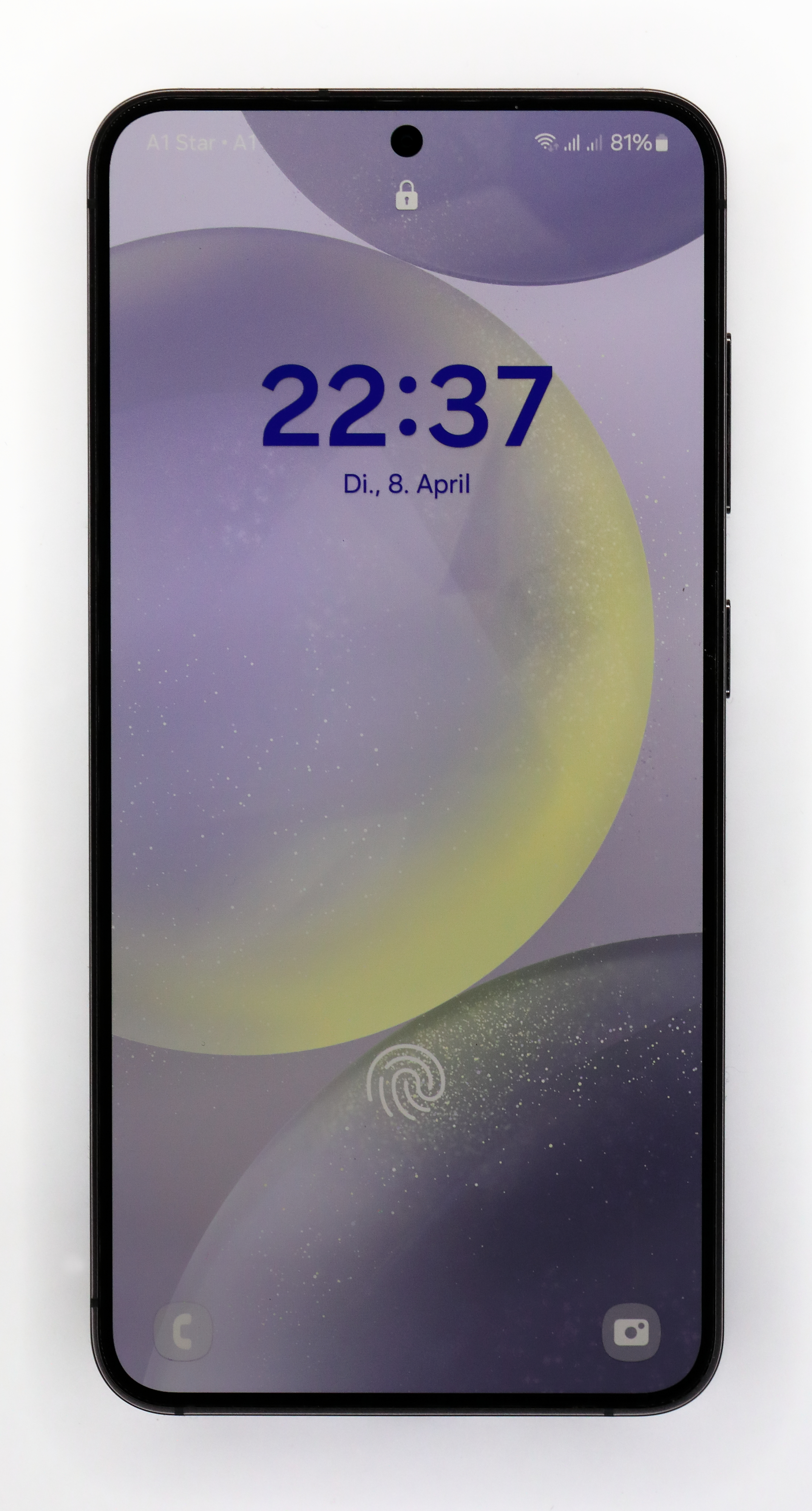
- Samsung Galaxy S24
- Brand: Samsung
- Manufacturer: Samsung Electronics
- Type: Smartphone
- Series: Galaxy S
- Family: Samsung Galaxy
- First released: S24, S24+ and S24 Ultra: January 31, 2024; 2 years ago S24 FE: October 3, 2024; 2 years ago
- Availability by region: S24, S24+ and S24 Ultra: January 31, 2024; 2 years ago S24 FE: October 3, 2024; 2 years ago
- Discontinued: S24, S24+ and S24 Ultra: January 22, 2025; 21 months ago S24 FE: September 4, 2025; 13 months ago
- Predecessor: Samsung Galaxy S23
- Successor: Samsung Galaxy S25
- Related: Samsung Galaxy Z Fold 6 Samsung Galaxy Z Flip 6 Samsung Galaxy Z Flip 7 FE
- Compatible networks: 2G / 3G / 4G / 5G
- Form factor: Slate
- Colors: S24 and S24+: Onyx Black, Marble Grey, Cobalt Violet, Amber Yellow, Jade Green, Sandstone Orange, Sapphire Blue; S24 Ultra: Titanium Black, Titanium Grey, Titanium Violet, Titanium Yellow, Titanium Blue, Titanium Green, Titanium Orange; S24 FE: Blue, Graphite, Gray, Mint, Yellow
- Dimensions: S24: 147×70.6×7.6 mm (5.79×2.78×0.30 in); S24+: 158.5×75.9×7.7 mm (6.24×2.99×0.30 in); S24 Ultra: 162.3×79×8.6 mm (6.39×3.11×0.34 in); S24 FE: 162.0×77.3×8.0 mm (6.38×3.04×0.31 in)
- Weight: S24: 168 g (5.9 oz); S24+: 197 g (6.9 oz); S24 Ultra: 233 g (8.2 oz); S24 FE: 213 g (7.5 oz)
- Operating system: Original (S24, S24+ and S24 Ultra): Android 14 with One UI 6.1; Original (S24 FE): Android 14 with One UI 6.1.1 (Note: Identifies as One UI 6.1.); Current: Android 17 with One UI 9.0
- System-on-chip: S24 and S24+ North America/East Asia (exc. South Korea) & S24 Ultra Worldwide: Qualcomm Snapdragon 8 Gen 3 (4 nm); S24 and S24+ Worldwide: Samsung Exynos 2400 (4 nm); S24 FE Worldwide: Samsung Exynos 2400e (4 nm)
- CPU: Snapdragon: Octa-core (1x3.3 GHz Cortex-X4 & 5x3.2 GHz Cortex-A720 & 2x2.3 GHz Cortex-A520); Exynos: Deca-core (1x3.2GHz Cortex-X4 & 2x2.9GHz Cortex-A720 & 3x2.6GHz Cortex-A720 & 4x1.95GHz Cortex-A520)
- GPU: Snapdragon: Adreno 750; Exynos: Xclipse 940 (based on AMD RDNA 3)
- Memory: 8 or 12 GB LPDDR5X-8533 RAM
- Storage: S24: 128/256 GB; S24+: 256/512 GB; S24 Ultra: 256/512 GB, 1 TB; S24 FE: 128/256 GB; UFS 3.1 (128 GB), 4.0 (256+ GB)
- SIM: 1x or 2x Nano-SIM and 1x eSIM
- Battery: S24: Li-ion 4000 mAh; S24+: 4900 mAh; S24 Ultra: 5000 mAh; S24 FE: 4700 mAh
- Charging: Qi wireless charging at 15W; Wired charging at 25W (S24 and S24 FE) or 45W (S24+ and S24 Ultra); Reverse charging at 4.5W (wired and wireless)
- Rear camera: S24 and S24+: 50 MP, f/1.8, 23mm (wide), 1/1.56", 1.0µm, Dual Pixel PDAF, OIS; 10 MP, f/2.4, 70mm (telephoto), 1/3.94", 1.0µm, PDAF, 3× optical tele 12 MP, f/2.2, 13mm, 120˚ (ultrawide), 1/2.55" 1.4µm, Super Steady video S24 Ultra: 200 MP, f/1.7, 23mm (wide), 1/1.3", 0.6µm, PDAF, Laser AF, OIS; 50 MP, f/3.4, 115mm (periscope telephoto), 1/2.6", 0.7µm, dual pixel PDAF, OIS, 5× optical tele 10 MP, f/2.4, 70mm (telephoto), 1/3.52", 1.12µm, dual pixel PDAF, OIS, 3× optical tele 12 MP, f/2.2, 13mm, 120˚ (ultrawide), 1/2.55", 1.4µm, dual pixel PDAF; S24 FE: 50 MP, f/1.8, 24mm (wide), dual pixel PDAF, OIS; 8 MP, f/2.4, 75mm (telephoto), PDAF, OIS, 3x optical zoom 12 MP, f/2.2, 123˚ (ultrawide)
- Front camera: 12 MP, f/2.2, 25mm (wide), PDAF; Dual video call, Auto-HDR, HDR10+ 4K@30/60fps, 1080p@30/60fps
- Display: Dynamic AMOLED 2X, Infinity-O, capacitive touchscreen, HDR10+, 1B colors, peak brightness 2600 nits, 120 Hz refresh rate S24: 6.2 in (160 mm) 2340 × 1080; S24+: 6.7 in (170 mm) 3120 × 1440; S24 Ultra: 6.8 in (170 mm) 3120 × 1440; S24 FE: 6.7 in (170 mm) 2340 × 1080
- Sound: Stereo speakers, Dolby Atmos
- Connectivity: Wi-Fi 6E, (Note: S24 Ultra has Wi-Fi 7.) tri-band, Wi-Fi Direct; Bluetooth 5.3, A2DP, LE; S24+ and S24 Ultra: UWB; US models only: 5G mmWave
- Data inputs: S Pen stylus (S24 Ultra); Accelerometer; Barometer; Fingerprint scanner (under display, optical on S24 FE and ultrasonic on other models); Pressure sensor; Magnetometer; Gyroscope; Hall sensor; Proximity sensor; RGB light sensor; Dual band GNSS (GPS/GLONASS/BeiDou/Galileo)
- Water resistance: IP68 dust and water resistant (Note: Water resistance rated up to 1.5m for 30 min)
- Website: Galaxy S24 & S24+ Galaxy S24 Ultra; Galaxy S24 FE

The Samsung Galaxy S24 is a series of high-end Android-based smartphones manufactured, developed, produced, and marketed by Samsung Electronics as part of its flagship Galaxy S series. They collectively serve as the successors to the Galaxy S23 series. The first three smartphones (Galaxy S24, Galaxy S24+, and the Galaxy S24 Ultra) were announced on January 17, 2024, at the Samsung's Galaxy Unpacked event in San Jose, California, and they were released in the United States and Europe on January 31, 2024. The Galaxy S24 FE was unveiled at the following event on September 26, 2024, alongside the Galaxy Tab S10 series, and released on October 3, 2024.

The Galaxy S24 series was succeeded by the Galaxy S25 series, which was announced on January 22, 2025.

== History ==
The successor to the Galaxy S23 series was the subject of months of speculation about its development and launch. Reports as early as July 2023 suggested Samsung would switch to a titanium frame, following the inclusion of a titanium frame on the iPhone 15 Pro. Multiple reports of the Galaxy S24 series were known, where the phones could arrive as early as January 2024, to pictures showing the actual Galaxy S24 Ultra, and alleged specs and renders of the supposed devices were leaked ahead of launch.

A week before its launch, it was reported that the Galaxy S24 series would get seven years of major OS upgrades, which was first introduced with the Pixel 8 series.

== Lineup ==
=== Dimensions ===
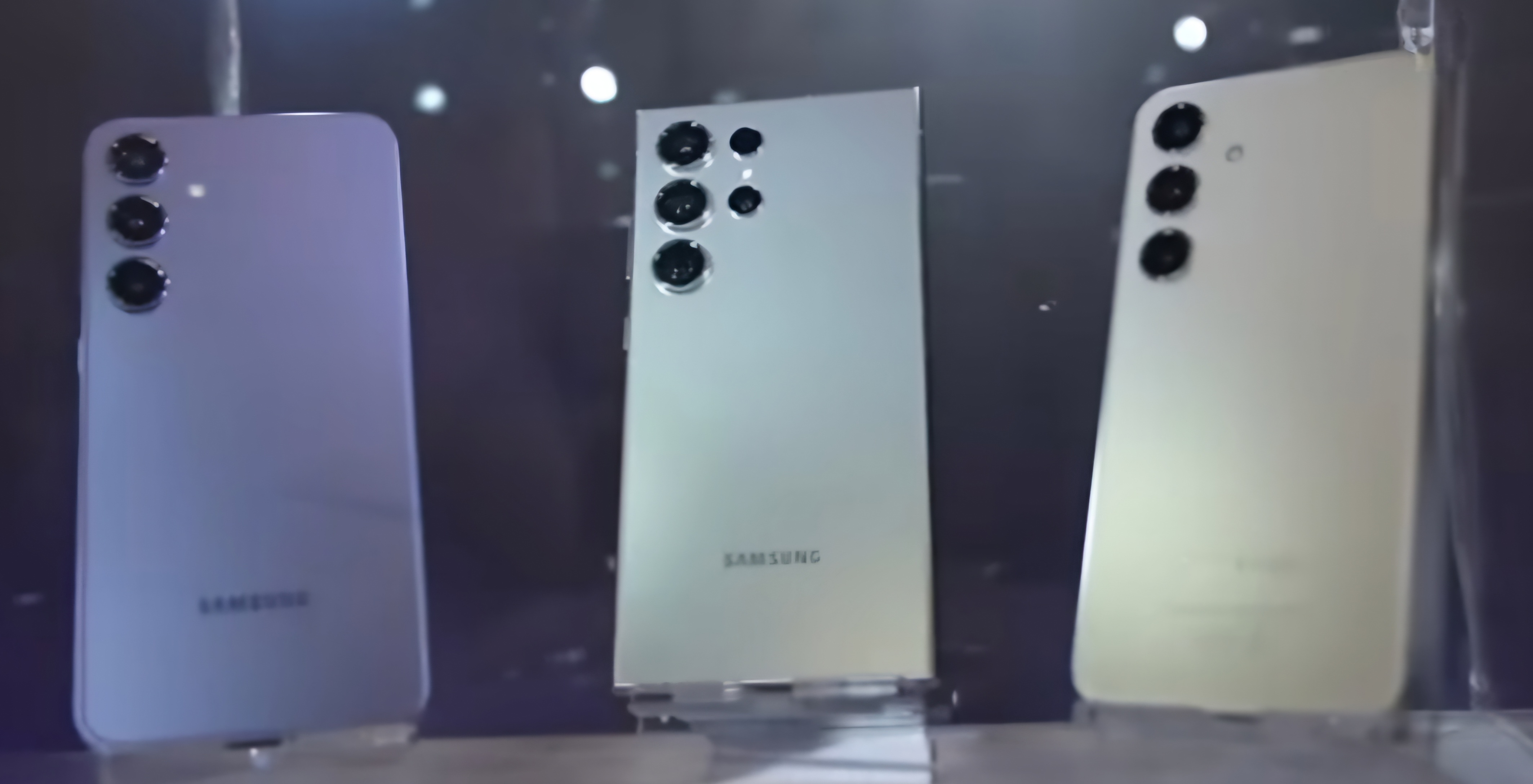
Left to right: Samsung Galaxy S24, S24 Ultra, S24+

The Galaxy S24 series includes four devices, which share the same lineup and screen sizes as the previous Galaxy S23 series. The flagship Galaxy S24 features a flat 6.2-inch (155 mm) display. The Galaxy S24+ features similar hardware in a 6.7-inch (168 mm) form factor. The Galaxy S24 Ultra features a flat 6.8-inch (173 mm) display, with sharp edges, distinct from its base model counterpart.

Galaxy S24 series dimensions
Model	Thickness	Weight
Galaxy S24	7.6 mm	162 g
Galaxy S24+	7.7 mm	190 g
Galaxy S24 Ultra	8.6 mm	218 g
Galaxy S24 FE	7.4 mm	190 g

=== Performance ===
The S24 and S24+ phones are powered by Snapdragon 8 Gen 3 in North America and in East Asia (China, Macau, Hong Kong, Taiwan, and Japan), while a Exynos 2400 is used in the rest of the world. The S24 Ultra is equipped with the Snapdragon 8 Gen 3 in every market. In contrast, the S24 FE comes with an underclocked variant of the Exynos 2400 called the Exynos 2400e in every market including North America.

A re-released version of the smaller S24 with the Snapdragon 8 Gen 3 processor was released exclusively in India in September 2025 (previously, the same device sold in India in January 2024 have the Exynos 2400 chipset).

== Design ==
The Galaxy S24 and S24+ have aluminum and matte glass versions and are available in four standard colors: Amber Yellow, Marble Gray, Cobalt Violet, and Onyx Black, with three additional colors available only through Samsung's website: Jade Green, Sapphire Blue and Sandstone Orange. The S24 Ultra features titanium versions of these colors. The Galaxy S24 FE has a limited set of 5 colors called Blue, Graphite, Gray, Mint, and Yellow.

	Galaxy S24 FE	Galaxy S24 and S24+	Galaxy S24 Ultra
Base colors	Graphite; Grey; Yellow; Blue; Mint	Onyx Black; Marble Grey; Amber Yellow; Cobalt Violet	Titanium Black; Titanium Grey; Titanium Yellow; Titanium Violet
Online exclusive colors	—N/a	Jade Green; Sapphire Blue; Sandstone Orange	Titanium Green; Titanium Blue; Titanium Orange

== Specifications ==
=== Display ===
The Galaxy S24 and S24+ use a "Dynamic AMOLED 2X" display with HDR10+ support, 2600 nits of peak brightness, LTPO backplane, "dynamic tone mapping" technology, and Corning Gorilla Glass Victus 2. The Galaxy S24 FE has 1900 nits of peak brightness and LTPS backplane. All models use an ultrasonic in-screen fingerprint sensor, except the S24 FE which uses an optical in-screen fingerprint sensor. The S24 series uses a variable refresh rate display with a range of 1 Hz or 24 Hz to 120 Hz, except the S24 FE which has a range of 60 Hz to 120 Hz.

The Galaxy S24 Ultra, in addition to the features of the S24+, uses Corning Gorilla Glass Armor glass on its display, but it drops the curved edges seen in the Galaxy S23 Ultra & Galaxy S22 Ultra.

Spec	Galaxy S24	Galaxy S24+	Galaxy S24 Ultra	Galaxy S24 FE
Display size	6.2 in (157 mm)	6.7 in (170 mm)	6.8 in (173 mm)	6.7 in (170 mm)
Resolution	2340×1080	3120×1440		2340×1080
Density	~416 ppi	~513 ppi	~505 ppi	~385 ppi
Aspect ratio	19.5:9			
Max refresh rate	120 Hz			
Variable refresh rate	1 Hz to 120 Hz			60 Hz to 120 Hz
Panel	Dynamic LTPO AMOLED 2X, HDR10+			
Cover glass	Gorilla Glass Victus 2		Gorilla Glass Armor	Gorilla Glass Victus Plus

=== Camera ===
The Galaxy S24 and S24+ each feature a triple rear camera system consisting of a 50 MP wide sensor, a 10 MP 3x telephoto sensor and a 12 MP ultrawide sensor. The S24 Ultra features a quad camera setup, including a 200 MP wide sensor, 50 MP 5× periscope telephoto sensor, 10 MP 3x telephoto sensor, and a 12 MP ultrawide sensor. The front camera uses a 12 MP sensor on the Galaxy S24, S24+, and S24 Ultra. The Galaxy S24 FE feature a triple rear camera system consisting of a 50MP wide sensor, a 8 MP 3x telephoto sensor, and a 12MP wide sensor. The front camera of the Galaxy S24 FE is a 10MP sensor.

Camera Type	Galaxy S24 FE	Galaxy S24	Galaxy S24+	Galaxy S24 Ultra
Wide	50 MP (f/1.8)			200 MP (f/1.7)
Ultra-wide	12 MP (f/2.2) (123° FOV)	12 MP (f/2.2) (120° FOV)		
Telephoto	8 MP (3×)	10 MP (3×)		
Periscope telephoto	n/a			50 MP (5×)
Front camera	10 MP (f/2.4)	12 MP (f/2.2)		
Additional features	Sensor-size & pixel-binning Super Steady mode			AI-powered zoom optimization Sensor-size & pixel-binning Super Steady mode
All models support 8K video recording at up to 30 fps.

=== Batteries ===
The Galaxy S24, S24+, S24 Ultra, and S24 FE contain internal 4,000 mAh, 4,900 mAh, 5,000 mAh, and 4,700 mAh Li-ion batteries respectively. The S24 and S24 FE charge at only 25 watts; the S24+ and S24 Ultra, at 45 watts.

	Galaxy S24	Galaxy S24+	Galaxy S24 Ultra	Galaxy S24 FE
Battery capacity	4,000 mAh	4,900 mAh	5,000 mAh	4,700 mAh
Wired charging speed	25 W	45 W		25 W
Qi2 wireless charging speed	15 W			
Reverse wireless charging speed	4.5 W			
Ref.				

=== Memory and storage ===
Just like its predecessor, it continued to offer similar storage options, with the Galaxy S24+ and Galaxy S24 Ultra now being sold in a sole 12 GB RAM option.

Model	Memory	Storage options	Storage type
Galaxy S24	8 GB / 12 GB	128 GB / 256 GB / 512 GB	UFS 3.1 (128 GB); UFS 4.0 (256/512 GB)
Galaxy S24+	12 GB	256 GB / 512 GB	UFS 4.0
Galaxy S24 Ultra	12 GB	256 GB / 512 GB / 1 TB	UFS 4.0
Galaxy S24 FE	8 GB	128 GB / 256 GB / 512 GB	UFS 3.1

=== Connectivity ===
The Galaxy S24, S24+, and S24 FE support 5G SA/NSA/Sub6, Wi-Fi 6E, and Bluetooth 5.3 connectivity, while the Galaxy S24 Ultra additionally supports Wi-Fi 7 and ultra-wideband (UWB). The S24+ also supports UWB. All models support 5G mmWave exclusively in the United States.

Model	Wi-Fi	Bluetooth	UWB	USB	NFC
Galaxy S24	Wi-Fi 6E	5.3	No	USB-C 3.2 (5Gbps)	Yes
Galaxy S24+	Wi-Fi 6E	5.3	Yes	USB-C 3.2 (5Gbps)	Yes
Galaxy S24 Ultra	Wi-Fi 7	5.3	Yes	USB-C 3.2 (5Gbps)	Yes
Galaxy S24 FE	Wi-Fi 6E	5.3	No	USB-C 3.2 (5Gbps)	Yes
Ref.					

=== Software ===
The Galaxy S24 models come with the Android 14 operating system with One UI 6.1 pre-installed, which was the latest version of Android available at the time of its release. Although they have a minor upgrade to One UI 6.1.1 on September 5, 2024 (still identified as One UI 6.1 in the settings).

The Galaxy S24 models are the first Galaxy S phones to support 7 years of OS and security updates, making Samsung the second among Android device manufacturers to offer 7 years of support (the first to do so was Google with the release of Pixel 8 lineup). This mean software updates will end within 2031.

The Galaxy S24 models are the last Galaxy S phones to ship with the original Google Assistant as the default on-device assistant, as the Galaxy S25 and later deeply integrated Google Gemini and made it the default assistant for that series. Gemini replaced the Google Assistant in the One UI 7.0 (Android 15) update.

Starting with the Galaxy S24, 32-bit ARMv7 applications are no longer supported due to restrictions in the SoC. Other Galaxy devices (except watches) from 2024 onwards will also not support 32-bit ARMv7 apps.

	Pre-installed OS	OS Upgrades history							End of support
	Pre-installed OS	1st	2nd	3rd	4th	5th	6th	7th	End of support
S24; S24+ S24 Ultra	Android 14 (One UI 6.1) Minor One UI update: (One UI 6.1.1); September 2024	Android 15 (One UI 7.0); April 2025	Android 16 (One UI 8.0); September 2025 (One UI 8.5); May 2026	Android 17 (One UI 9.0); October 2026					Within 2031
S24 FE	Android 14 (One UI 6.1.1)	Android 15 (One UI 7.0); April 2025	Android 16 (One UI 8.0); September 2025 (One UI 8.5); May 2026						Within 2031

==== Galaxy AI ====
Galaxy AI is Samsung's branding for its artificial intelligence features introduced with the Galaxy S24 series, integrating generative AI capabilities into One UI. The platform combines on-device processing with cloud-based AI services to support communication, productivity, and multimedia functions.

In mainland China, the cloud partner is Baidu providing its Ernie model, while in international markets (including Hong Kong and Taiwan), the cloud partner is Google providing its Gemini Pro model.

All models in the Galaxy S24 series use Google's on-device Gemini Nano, already used by their own Pixel 8 Pro and their Pixel 9 series.

== Reception ==
=== S Pen burnt smell ===
Some users noted the unpleasant smell of the Galaxy S24 Ultra's S Pen, likened to "burnt plastic". A moderator on Samsung's EU forums said the smell was a normal part of the pen's operation, and "isn't anything to be concerned about".

This smell is likely from chemical reactions to the plastic shell of the S Pen, induced by the internal heat of the phone.

== Issues ==
Many S24 Ultra users had experienced battery drain and overheating after installing the July 2026 security update. Users had traced the issue over to WhatsApp where the backup process would get stuck during the installation of the update.

== See also ==
- List of longest smartphone telephoto lenses

== Notes ==
Preceded by Samsung Galaxy S23	Samsung Galaxy S24; 2024	Succeeded by Samsung Galaxy S25
