= Samsung Galaxy S21 =

2021 flagship smartphones by Samsung Electronics

Samsung Galaxy S21 series

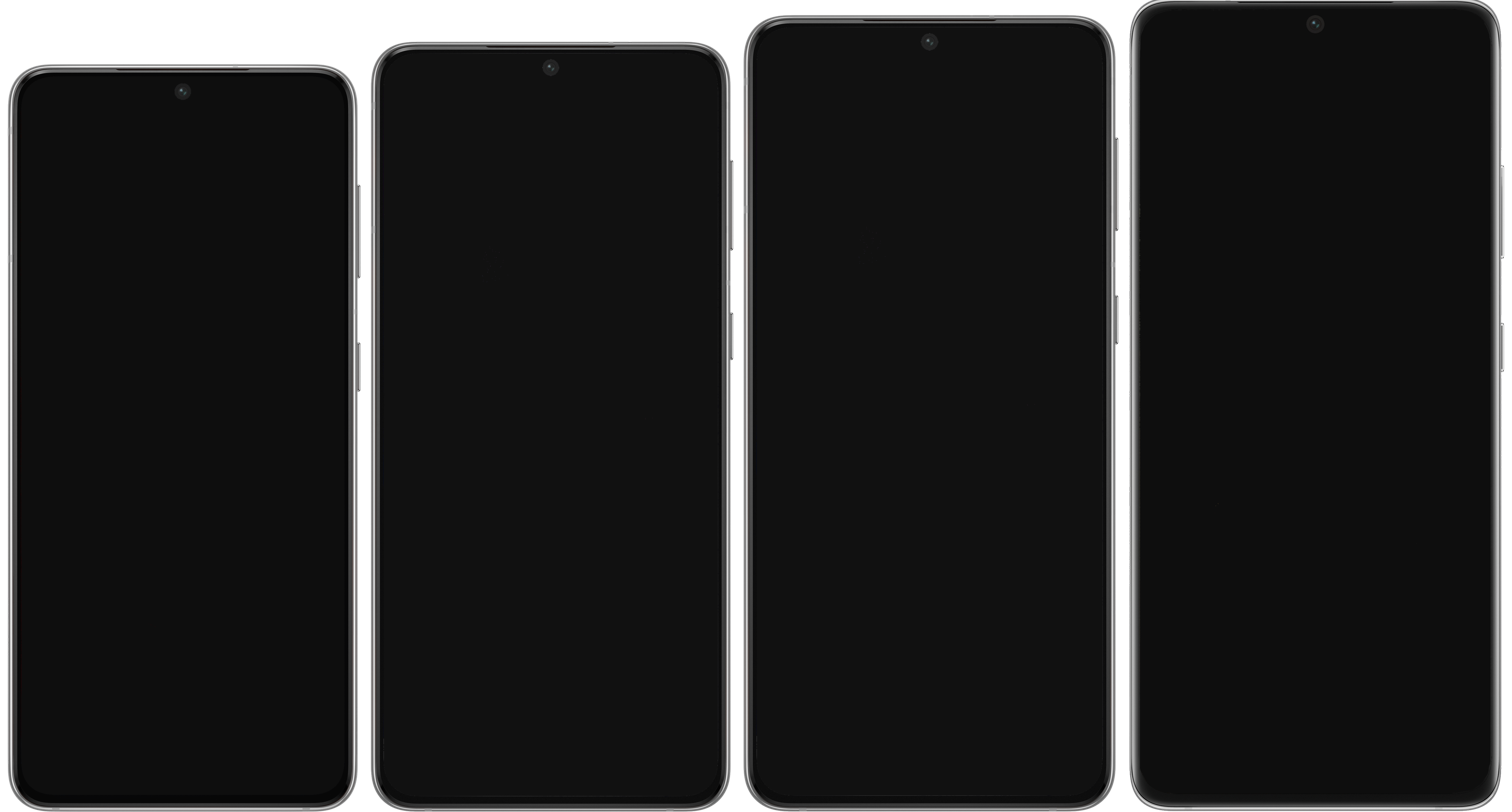
- From left to right: S21, S21 FE, S21+, and S21 Ultra
- Brand: Samsung
- Manufacturer: Samsung Electronics
- Type: Smartphone
- Series: Galaxy S
- Family: Samsung Galaxy
- First released: S21, S21+ and S21 Ultra: January 14, 2021; 5 years ago S21 FE: January 4, 2022; 4 years ago
- Availability by region: S21, S21+ and S21 Ultra: January 29, 2021; 5 years ago S21 FE: January 7, 2022; 4 years ago
- Discontinued: S21, S21+ and S21 Ultra: February 25, 2022; 4 years ago S21 FE: October 3, 2023; 3 years ago
- Units shipped: 25.5 million
- Predecessor: Samsung Galaxy S20; Samsung Galaxy Note 20 (indirect for S21 Ultra)
- Successor: Samsung Galaxy S22; Samsung Galaxy S23 FE (for S21 FE)
- Related: Samsung Galaxy Z Fold 3 Samsung Galaxy Z Flip 3
- Compatible networks: 2G, 3G, 4G, 5G
- Form factor: Slate
- Dimensions: S21: 151.7 × 71.2 × 7.9 mm (5.97 × 2.80 × 0.31 in); S21+: 161.5 × 75.6 × 7.8 mm (6.36 × 2.98 × 0.31 in); S21 Ultra: 165.1 × 75.6 × 8.9 mm (6.50 × 2.98 × 0.35 in); S21 FE: 155.7 × 74.5 × 7.9 mm (6.13 × 2.93 × 0.31 in)
- Weight: S21: 169 g (6.0 oz); S21+: 200 g (7.1 oz); S21 Ultra: 227 g (8.0 oz); S21 FE: 177 g (6.2 oz)
- Operating system: S21, S21+ and S21 Ultra: Original: Android 11 with One UI 3.1; Current: Android 15 with One UI 7 S21 FE: Original: Android 12 with One UI 4 Current: Android 16 with One UI 8
- System-on-chip: International: Samsung Exynos 2100; United States, Canada, China, Japan: Qualcomm Snapdragon 888
- CPU: Exynos: Octa-core (1x2.9 GHz Cortex-X1, 3x2.80 GHz Cortex-A78 and 4x2.2 GHz Cortex-A55); Snapdragon: Octa-core (1x2.84 GHz, 3x2.42 GHz and 4x1.80 GHz) Kryo 680
- GPU: Exynos: Mali-G78 MP14; Snapdragon: Adreno 660
- Memory: S21 and S21+: 8 GB RAM; S21 Ultra: 12/16 GB RAM; S21 FE: 6/8 GB RAM
- Storage: S21, S21+ and S21 FE: 128/256 GB UFS 3.1; S21 Ultra: 128/256/512 GB UFS 3.1
- Removable storage: None
- SIM: nanoSIM, eSIM; Single SIM or Hybrid Dual SIM in dual stand-by
- Battery: S21: 4000 mAh Lithium polymer S21+: 4800 mAh Lithium polymer S21 Ultra: 5000 mAh Lithium polymer S21 FE: 4500 mAh Lithium polymer
- Charging: USB PD: 25W (PPS), 15W (non-PPS); 15 W QI wireless 4.5 W Reverse wireless
- Rear camera: All: Features: LED flash, auto-HDR, panorama Video: 8K@24fps, 4K@30/60fps, 1080p@30/60/120fps, 720p@960fps, HDR10+, stereo sound rec., gyro-EIS & OIS; S21 and S21+: 12 MP, f/1.8, 26 mm (wide), 1/1.76", 1.8 μm, Dual Pixel PDAF, OIS; 64 MP, f/2.0, 28 mm (telephoto), 1/1.76", 0.8 μm, PDAF, OIS, 1.1x optical, 3x hybrid 12 MP, f/2.2, 13 mm 120° (ultrawide), 1/2.55" 1.4 μm, Super Steady video S21 Ultra: 108 MP (2nd gen), f/1.8, 26 mm (wide), 1/1.33", 0.8 μm, PDAF, Laser AF, OIS; 10 MP, f/4.9, 240 mm (periscope telephoto), 1/3.24", 1.22 μm, dual pixel PDAF, OIS, 10x optical 10 MP, f/2.4, 70 mm (telephoto), 1/3.24", 1.22 μm, dual pixel PDAF, OIS, 3x optical 12 MP, f/2.2, 13 mm (ultrawide), 1/2.55", 1.4 μm, dual pixel PDAF, Super Steady video S21 FE: 12 MP, f/1.8, 26 mm (wide), Dual Pixel PDAF, OIS; 8 MP, f/2.4, 76 mm (telephoto), 1/1.76", 0.8 μm, PDAF, 3x optical 12 MP, f/2.2, 13 mm 123° (ultrawide)
- Front camera: S21 and S21+: 10 MP, f/2.2, 26 mm (wide), 1/3.24", 1.22 μm, Dual Pixel PDAF; S21 Ultra: 40 MP, f/2.2, 26 mm (wide), 1/2.8", 0.7 μm, PDAF; S21 FE: 32 MP, f/2.2, 26 mm (wide), 1/2.74", 0.8 μm, Dual Pixel PDAF
- Display: Dynamic AMOLED 2X Infinity-O capacitive touchscreen, 10Hz-120 Hz refresh rate, 20:9 aspect ratio, HDR10+, (Diamond PenTile); S21: 6.2 in (160 mm) 2400 × 1080 (2.5 MP) (421 ppi) 1300 nits; S21+: 6.7 in (170 mm) 2400 × 1080 (394 ppi) 1300 nits; S21 Ultra: 6.8 in (170 mm) 3200 × 1440 (4.6 MP) (515 ppi) 1600 nits; S21 FE: 6.4 in (160 mm) 2340 × 1080 (411 ppi) 1300 nits
- External display: Always on
- Sound: Dolby Atmos stereo speakers tuned by AKG
- Connectivity: Bluetooth 5.2; Wi-Fi 802.11 a/b/g/n/ac/ax(Wi-Fi 6E: S21 Ultra)
- Data inputs: USB-C 3.2 Sensors: Accelerometer; Barometer; Fingerprint scanner (S21, S21+ and S21 Ultra: ultrasonic) (S21 FE: optical); Pressure sensor; Magnetometer; Gyroscope; Hall sensor; Proximity sensor; RGB Light Sensor
- Water resistance: IP68 water/dust resistance, up to 1.5 m for 30 minutes
- Website: Galaxy S21 & S21+; Galaxy S21 Ultra; Galaxy S21 FE

The Samsung Galaxy S21 is a series of high-end Android-based smartphones developed, marketed, and manufactured by Samsung Electronics as part of its flagship Galaxy S series. They collectively serve as the successor to the Galaxy S20 series. The first three smartphones (Galaxy S21, Galaxy S21+, Galaxy S21 Ultra) were unveiled at Samsung's Galaxy Unpacked event on January 14, 2021, while the Galaxy S21 FE was unveiled at Samsung's CES on January 4, 2022. The first three phones were released in the United States and Europe on January 29, 2021, while the Fan Edition was released globally on January 7, 2022. All four S21 series models were the first Samsung candybar flagships not given a 4G version. They were succeeded by the Galaxy S22 series announced on February 9, 2022.

== Lineup ==
The line-up consists of four devices: Galaxy S21, Galaxy S21+, Galaxy S21 Ultra, and the Galaxy S21 FE. The devices would be the first time since the Galaxy S6 to remove the microSD card slot. The S21 Ultra is the first phone in the Galaxy S series to support the S Pen, albeit sold separately and with limited functionality. It is the last phone of the Galaxy S series to use the former "SM-G9xx" model number format for the flagship device which had been in use since the Galaxy S5 as Samsung started to use the new "SM-S123X" model number format for future flagships starting with the Galaxy S22.

=== Performance ===
The S21 line comprises four models with different chipsets used. International and Korean models of the S21 utilize the Exynos 2100 SoC, while the U.S., Canadian, Chinese, Taiwanese, Hong Kong and Japanese models utilize the Qualcomm Snapdragon 888. The U.S., Canadian, Chinese, and international (European) models of the S21 FE use the Snapdragon 888, while Korean, Indian, Brazilian and Australian markets use Exynos 2100.

== Design ==
The Galaxy S21 series has a design similar to its predecessor, with an Infinity-O display containing a circular cutout in the top center for the front selfie camera. The S21 and S21 FE's back panel is reinforced poly-carbonate (plastic) similar to the S20 FE and Note 20, while the S21+ and S21 Ultra use Gorilla Glass Victus. The rear camera array has been integrated into the phone body except for the S21 FE which is made out of reinforced poly-carbonate integrated instead on the back cover and has a metallic surround; the S21 Ultra has a carbon fiber camera surround for exclusive colors.

	Galaxy S21 FE	Galaxy S21	Galaxy S21+	Galaxy S21 Ultra
Base colors	White; Graphite; Lavender; Olive	Phantom White; Phantom Gray; Phantom Violet; Phantom Pink	Phantom Silver; Phantom Black; Phantom Violet	Phantom Silver; Phantom Black
Online exclusive colors	—N/a	—N/a	Phantom Gold; Phantom Red	Phantom Titanium; Phantom Navy; Phantom Brown

== Specifications ==
=== Hardware ===
==== Display ====
The S21 series features "Dynamic AMOLED 2X" displays with HDR10+ support and "dynamic tone mapping" technology. All models except the S21 FE utilize a second-generation ultrasonic in-screen fingerprint sensor with the latter opting for an optical in-screen system instead. The S21 Ultra is also now able to use 120 Hz at 1440p unlike its predecessor (which was limited to 120 Hz at only 1080p).

Spec	Galaxy S21 FE	Galaxy S21	Galaxy S21+	Galaxy S21 Ultra
Display size	6.4 in (163 mm)	6.2 in (157 mm)	6.7 in (170 mm)	6.8 in (173 mm)
Resolution	2340×1080	2400×1080		3200×1440
Density	~403 ppi	~421 ppi	~394 ppi	~515 ppi
Aspect ratio	19.5:9	20:9		
Refresh rate	60 Hz / 120 Hz	48 Hz to 120 Hz		10 Hz to 120 Hz
Panel	Dynamic LTPO AMOLED 2X, HDR10+			
Cover glass	Gorilla Glass Victus			
Ref.				

==== Cameras ====
The S21 and S21+ continue to have a similar camera setup to their predecessors but benefit from improved software and image processing. The S21 FE also have a similar camera setup to its predecessor but benefits from improved software and image processing. The S21 Ultra also carries over the primary rear, ultrawide, and front camera sensors from its predecessor, and introduces two different telephoto sensors. The S21 Ultra also introduces support for 12-bit RAW photo capture, and improvements to slow-motion quality. All devices can record HDR10+ video and support HEIF.

Camera comparison on Galaxy S21 Series
Models	Galaxy S21 & S21+	Galaxy S21 Ultra	Galaxy S21 FE
Wide	12 MP (f/1.8)	108 MP (f/1.8)	12 MP (f/1.8)
Ultrawide	12 MP (120° FOV)		
Telephoto	64 MP (3×) (f/2.0)	10 MP (3×) (f/2.4)	8 MP (3×) (f/2.4)
Periscope Telephoto	—N/a	10 MP (10×) (f/4.9)	—N/a
Front	10 MP (f/2.2)	40 MP (f/2.2)	32 MP (f/2.2)
Galaxy S21/S21+/S21 Ultra support 8K video recording at up to 24fps Galaxy S21 FE support 4K video recording at up to 60fps

===== Moon photo controversy =====
Users discovered that the Scene Optimizer included with Samsung Galaxy S21 and later phones use artificial intelligence to identify the Moon and add details that the camera is not capable of capturing, based on a library of existing moon photos. However, this was disputed by Samsung, claiming that they have an AI enhancement algorithm that adds detail to the moon photos.

==== Memory and storage ====
Model	Memory	Storage options	Storage type
Galaxy S21	8 GB	128 GB / 256 GB	UFS 3.1
Galaxy S21+	8 GB	128 GB / 256 GB	UFS 3.1
Galaxy S21 Ultra	12 GB / 16 GB	128 GB / 256 GB / 512 GB	UFS 3.1
Galaxy S21 FE	6 GB / 8 GB	128 GB / 256 GB	UFS 3.1
Ref.			

The S21 and S21+ offer 8 GB of RAM with 128 and 256 GB options for internal storage. The S21 Ultra has 12 GB of RAM with 128 and 256 GB options as well as a 16 GB option with 512 GB of internal storage. The S21 FE offers 6 and 8 GB of RAM with 128 and 256 GB options for internal storage. All four models lack a microSD card slot, which was present in the S20 series.

==== Batteries ====
The S21, S21 FE, S21+, and S21 Ultra contain non-removable 4000 mAh, 4,500 mAh, 4800 mAh, and 5000 mAh batteries respectively. All four models support wired charging over USB-C at up to 25W (using USB Power Delivery) as well as Qi inductive charging up to 15W. The phones also can charge other Qi-compatible devices from the S21's battery power, which is branded as "Wireless PowerShare," at up to 4.5W.

	Galaxy S21 FE	Galaxy S21	Galaxy S21+	Galaxy S21 Ultra
Battery capacity	4,500 mAh	4,000 mAh	4,800 mAh	5,000 mAh
Wired charging speed	25 W			
Qi2 wireless charging speed	15 W			
Reverse wireless charging speed	4.5 W			
Ref.				

==== Connectivity ====
All four phones support 5G SA/NSA networks. The Galaxy S21, S21+, and S21 FE support Wi-Fi 6 and Bluetooth 5.0, while the Galaxy S21 Ultra supports Wi-Fi 6E and Bluetooth 5.2. The S21+ and S21 Ultra models also support Ultra Wideband (UWB) for short-range communications similar to NFC (not to be confused with 5G mmWave, which is marketed as Ultra Wideband by Verizon). Samsung uses this technology for their new "SmartThings Find" feature and the Samsung Galaxy SmartTag+.

Model	Wi-Fi	Bluetooth	UWB	USB	NFC
Galaxy S21 FE	Wi-Fi 6	5.0	No	USB-C 3.2 (5Gbps)	Yes
Galaxy S21	Wi-Fi 6	5.0	No	USB-C 3.2 (5Gbps)	Yes
Galaxy S21+	Wi-Fi 6	5.0	Yes	USB-C 3.2 (5Gbps)	Yes
Galaxy S21 Ultra	Wi-Fi 6E	5.2	Yes	USB-C 3.2 (5Gbps)	Yes
Ref.					

=== Software ===
The first three S21 phones were released with Android 11 (One UI 3.1), while the S21 FE was released with Android 12 (One UI 4). They all use Samsung Knox for enhanced device factory reset protection (FRP) security, and a separate version exist for enterprise use. All of the S21 phones are eligible for four Android OS updates and five years of security updates.

	Pre-installed OS	OS Upgrades history				End of support
	Pre-installed OS	1st	2nd	3rd	4th	End of support
S21; S21+ S21 Ultra	Android 11 (One UI 3.1)	Android 12 (One UI 4.0); November 2021 (One UI 4.1); March 2022	Android 13 (One UI 5.0); November 2022 (One UI 5.1); February 2023	Android 14 (One UI 6.0); November 2023 (One UI 6.1); May 2024	Android 15 (One UI 7.0); April 2025	February 2026
S21 FE	Android 12 (One UI 4.0) Minor One UI update: (One UI 4.1); March 2022	Android 13 (One UI 5.0); November 2022 (One UI 5.1); February 2023	Android 14 (One UI 6.0); December 2023 (One UI 6.1); May 2024	Android 15 (One UI 7.0); May 2025	Android 16 (One UI 8.0); October 2025	Within 2027

== Reception ==
The Verge's review, by Dieter Bohn, praised the S21 Ultra's punchy display, fast performance, long-lasting battery life and the general improvements to the camera system, likening the latter to that of the iPhone 12 Pro Max's; however, Bohn did note that the phone's glass back is slightly more susceptible to minor scratches. Android Authority's review by David Imel noted the Samsung's Galaxy S21 Ultra "is a powerhouse smartphone" and that "the camera system in Samsung Galaxy S21 Ultra is one of the best you can get on Android". Matt Sweder at Techradar gave a positive review noting its "mesmerizing design" calling it "Samsung's best-looking phone ever" and how "phenomenally powerful" the camera is, but also went on to criticize the price and lack of microSD card slot, and questioning the stylus support, which is a separate purchase, with nowhere to put the S Pen on the phone itself.

Criticism has been aimed at the lack of a charger and memory card-expandable storage, the latter of which existed on the preceding Galaxy S20. In 2018, Samsung made fun of iPhone's lack of the same features and an audio connector port in a series of commercials for the Galaxy S9 named "Ingenious", where unhappy iPhone customers confront an Apple Store employee over the lack of functionality that the Galaxy S9 was equipped with, a feature which has since been removed from all Galaxy phones.

Following Apple, Samsung decided not to include a wall charger or earphones when selling the Galaxy S21 series of smartphones, the reasoning being that "Samsung believes the removal of earphones and charger plugs from our in-box device packaging can help address the growing e-waste problem and unnecessary duplication of these items". However, reaching the highest charging rate possibly requires a new charger with separate packaging and shipping with a standalone environmental footprint.

== See also ==
- List of longest smartphone telephoto lenses

Preceded by Samsung Galaxy S20	Samsung Galaxy S21; 2021	Succeeded by Samsung Galaxy S22
