= Samsung Galaxy S22 =

2022 flagship smartphones by Samsung Electronics

Samsung Galaxy S22 series

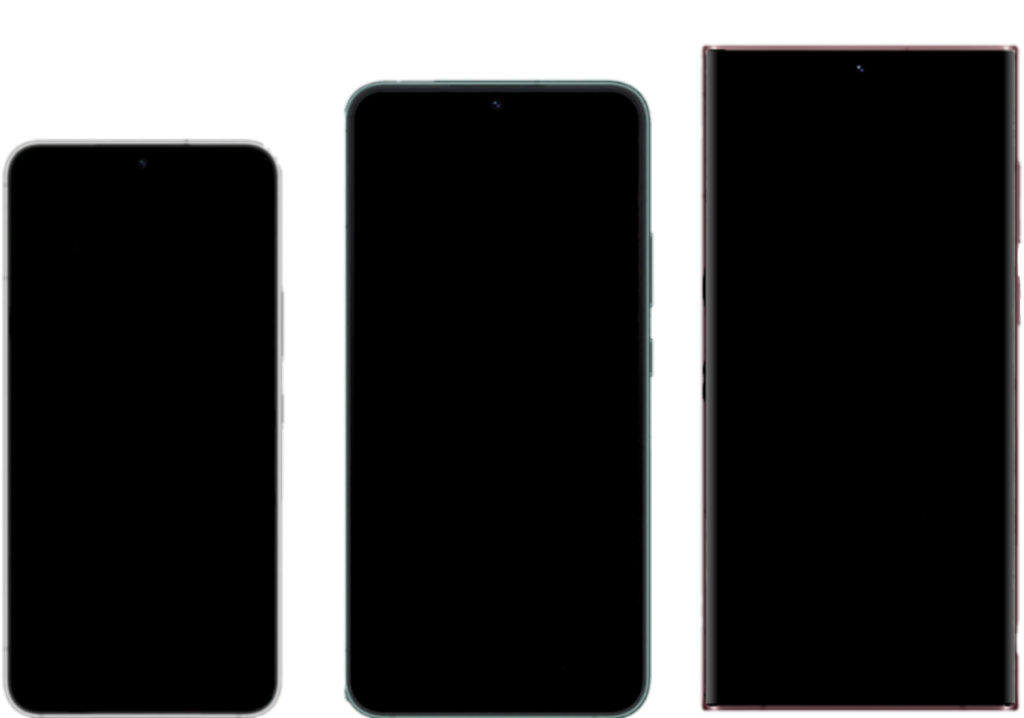
- S22, S22+ and S22 Ultra
- Brand: Samsung
- Manufacturer: Samsung Electronics
- Type: Smartphone
- Series: Galaxy S
- Family: Samsung Galaxy
- First released: February 9, 2022; 4 years ago
- Availability by region: February 25, 2022; 4 years ago
- Discontinued: February 1, 2023; 3 years ago
- Predecessor: Samsung Galaxy S21; Samsung Galaxy Note 20 (for S22 Ultra)
- Successor: Samsung Galaxy S23
- Related: Samsung Galaxy Z Fold 4 Samsung Galaxy Z Flip 4
- Compatible networks: 2G, 3G, 4G, 5G
- Form factor: Slate
- Dimensions: S22: 146 × 70.6 × 7.6 mm (5.75 × 2.78 × 0.30 in); S22+: 157.4 × 75.8 × 7.6 mm (6.20 × 2.98 × 0.30 in); S22 Ultra: 163.3 × 77.9 × 8.9 mm (6.43 × 3.07 × 0.35 in)
- Weight: S22: 167 g (5.9 oz); S22+: 195 g (6.9 oz); S22 Ultra: 228 g (8.0 oz)
- Operating system: Original: Android 12 with One UI 4.1; Current: Android 16 with One UI 8
- System-on-chip: Europe: Samsung Exynos 2200; Global: Qualcomm Snapdragon 8 Gen 1
- CPU: Exynos: Octa-core, (1×2.80 GHz Cortex-X2 & 3×2.50 GHz Cortex-A710 & 4×1.80 GHz Cortex-A510); Snapdragon: Octa-core, (1×3.00 GHz Cortex-X2 & 3×2.40 GHz Cortex-A710 & 4×1.70 GHz Cortex-A510)
- GPU: Exynos: Xclipse 920 (based on AMD RDNA 2); Snapdragon: Adreno 730
- Memory: S22 and S22+: 8 GB RAM; S22 Ultra: 8 or 12 GB RAM
- Storage: UFS 3.1; S22/S22+: 128 or 256 GB; S22 Ultra: 128, 256, 512 GB or 1 TB
- Removable storage: None
- SIM: nanoSIM, eSIM; Single SIM or Hybrid Dual SIM in dual stand-by
- Battery: S22: 3700 mAh; S22+: 4500 mAh; S22 Ultra: 5000 mAh
- Charging: USB PD: S22: 25 W (PPS), 15W (non-PPS); S22+ and S22 Ultra: 45W (PPS), 15W (non-PPS); All models: 15W wireless
- Rear camera: S22 and S22+: 50 MP, f/1.8, 24 mm (wide), 1/1.56", 1.0µm, Dual Pixel PDAF, OIS 10 MP, f/2.4, 70 mm (telephoto), 1/3.94", 1.0µm, PDAF, OIS, 3x optical zoom 12 MP, f/2.2, 13 mm, 120˚ (ultrawide), 1/2.55" 1.4µm, Super Steady video; S22 Ultra: 108 MP, f/1.8, 24 mm (wide), 1/1.33", 0.8µm, PDAF, Laser AF, OIS 10 MP, f/4.9, 230 mm (telephoto), 1/3.52", 1.12µm, dual pixel PDAF, OIS, 10x optical zoom 10 MP, f/2.4, 70 mm (telephoto), 1/3.52", 1.12µm, dual pixel PDAF, OIS, 3x optical zoom 12 MP, f/2.2, 13 mm, 120˚ (ultrawide), 1/2.55", 1.4µm, dual pixel PDAF, Super Steady video
- Front camera: S22 and S22+: 10 MP, f/2.2, 26 mm (wide), 1/3.24", 1.22µm, Dual Pixel PDAF; S22 Ultra: 40 MP, f/2.2, 26 mm (wide), 1/2.8", 0.7µm, PDAF
- Display: Dynamic AMOLED 2X Infinity-O capacitive touchscreen, HDR10+, 1 billion colours, 1750 nits (peak), Diamond PenTile; S22: 6.1 in (150 mm) 2340 × 1080 (425 ppi), 19.5:9 aspect ratio, 120 Hz refresh rate; S22+: 6.6 in (170 mm) 2340 × 1080 (393 ppi), 19.5:9 aspect ratio, 120 Hz; S22 Ultra: 6.8 in (170 mm) 3088 × 1440 (500 ppi), 19.3:9 aspect ratio, 120 Hz LTPO
- Sound: Dolby Atmos stereo speakers tuned by AKG
- Connectivity: USB-C 3.2; Wi-Fi 802.11 a/b/g/n/ac/6(6e: S22+ and S22 Ultra), dual-band (S22)/tri-band (S22+ and S22 Ultra), Wi-Fi Direct, hotspot Bluetooth 5.2, A2DP, LE
- Data inputs: S Pen (S22 Ultra); Accelerometer; Barometer; Fingerprint scanner (under display, ultrasonic); Pressure sensor; Magnetometer; Gyroscope; Hall sensor; Proximity sensor; RGB light sensor; Dual band GNSS (GPS/GLONASS/BeiDou/Galileo) (single band on Exynos)
- Water resistance: IP68 water and dust resistance, up to 1.5 m for 30 minutes
- Website: Galaxy S22 & S22+; Galaxy S22 Ultra

The Samsung Galaxy S22 is a series of high-end Android-based smartphones developed, manufactured, and marketed by Samsung Electronics as part of its flagship Galaxy S series. The S22 series were unveiled at Samsung's Galaxy Unpacked event (alongside the Galaxy Tab S8 series) on February 9, 2022, and were released on February 25, 2022.

The S22 Ultra serves as the official successor to the Galaxy Note 20 and the Note line-up, housing an integrated S-Pen.

They collectively serve as the successor to the Samsung Galaxy S21 series, except the S21 FE. This series marks the first time to not have a FE model since the release of the Galaxy S20 FE. The Galaxy S22 series were succeeded by the Galaxy S23 series, which was announced on February 1, 2023.

== History ==
Before its official announcement, there were rumors the Samsung was considering cancelling the Galaxy Note series due to chip shortages. However, Samsung confirmed in July 2021 that there won’t be a Samsung Galaxy Note 21, and suggesting that Samsung is planning to expand "beloved Note features" to more Galaxy devices.

In September 2021, renders were shown involving the built-in S Pen on the Galaxy S22 Ultra. The Galaxy S22's existence was first revealed in a picture showing a working Galaxy S22 Ultra, with its S Pen ahead of its unveiling.

The S22's images were leaked in December 2021, showing a Galaxy S22 Ultra with its S Pen. The Galaxy Unpacked event was teased in January 2022, confirming the S22's new design and features. A picture was posted showing the Galaxy S22 series poster in an AT&T store in February 2022, two days before the official launch.

The Galaxy S22, S22+ and S22 Ultra were officially announced during Samsung's Galaxy Unpacked event on February 9, 2022, The S22 Ultra features a S Pen like with the Galaxy Note series.

== Lineup ==
=== Dimensions ===
The S22 line consists of three devices: the Galaxy S22 (with a 6.1-inch (155 mm) screen), the Galaxy S22+ (which has similar hardware in a larger form factor, with a 6.6-inch (168 mm) screen, faster charging and a larger battery capacity), and the Galaxy S22 Ultra has a 6.8-inch (173 mm) screen and the largest battery capacity in the line-up, with a more advanced camera setup and a higher resolution display compared to the S22 and S22+. The latter device also embeds the S Pen, a first in the Galaxy S series after the discontinuation of the Galaxy Note.

=== Performance ===
The S22 line comprises three models with various hardware specifications. Except for some African and all European countries that use the Exynos 2200 (with a new GPU with AMD), all models outside these regions use the Qualcomm Snapdragon 8 Gen 1.

== Design ==
The Galaxy S22 series has a design similar to preceding S series phones, with an Infinity-O display containing a circular cutout in the top center for the front selfie camera. All three models now use Gorilla Glass Victus+ for the back panel, unlike the S21 series, which had plastic back (for the smaller S21 model). The rear camera array on the S22 and S22+ has a metallic surround, while the S22 Ultra has a separate lens protrusion for each camera element.

	Galaxy S22 and S22+	Galaxy S22 Ultra
Base colors	Phantom White; Phantom Black; Green; Pink Gold	Phantom White; Phantom Black; Green; Burgundy
Online exclusive colors	Graphite; Sky Blue; Cream; Violet	Graphite with black frame; Sky Blue with black frame; Red with black frame

== Features ==
=== Hardware ===
==== Display ====
The S22 series feature "Dynamic AMOLED 2X" displays with HDR10+ support and "dynamic tone mapping" technology. All models use a second-generation ultrasonic in-screen fingerprint sensor.

Spec	Galaxy S22	Galaxy S22+	Galaxy S22 Ultra
Display size	6.1 in (155 mm)	6.6 in (168 mm)	6.8 in (173 mm)
Resolution	2340×1080		3088×1440
ProScaler	No	Yes	
Density	~416 ppi	~513 ppi	~498 ppi
Aspect ratio	19.5:9		
Refresh rate	48 Hz to 120 Hz		1 Hz to 120 Hz
Panel	Dynamic LTPO AMOLED 2X, HDR10+		
Cover glass	Gorilla Glass Victus+		

==== Cameras ====
The Galaxy S22 and S22+ brings an upgraded 50 MP wide‑angle main camera (from the 12 MP found on its predecessor), but had a downgrade in the telephoto camera (12 MP vs 64 MP found on its predecessor); the front camera (10 MP) and ultrawide rear camera (12 MP) remains unchanged.

The Galaxy S22 Ultra, meanwhile, features a quad camera setup, featuring a 108 MP wide camera, a pair of 10 MP telephoto sensors, and 40 MP front camera.

Camera Type	Galaxy S22	Galaxy S22+	Galaxy S22 Ultra
Wide	50 MP (f/1.8)		108 MP (f/1.8)
Ultra-wide	12 MP (120° FOV)		
Telephoto	10 MP (3×) (f/2.4)		
Periscope telephoto	n/a		50 MP (5×) (f/2.9)
Front camera	12 MP (f/2.2)		40 MP (f/2.2)
Additional features	Sensor-size & pixel-binning Super Steady mode (with Horizon Lock)		Space Zoom (up to 100×) Sensor-size & pixel-binning Super Steady mode (with Horizon Lock)
All models support 8K video recording at up to 24 fps.

==== Memory and storage ====
The S22 and S22+ offer 8 GB of RAM with 128 and 256 GB options for internal storage. The S22 Ultra has 8 GB of RAM with 128 GB as well as a 12 GB option with 256, 512 GB and 1 TB options for internal storage. Unlike the S21 Ultra, the S22 Ultra doesn't feature a model with a 16 GB RAM variant. All three models lack a microSD card slot.

Model	Memory	Storage options	Storage type
Galaxy S22	8 GB	128 GB / 256 GB	UFS 3.1
Galaxy S22+	8 GB	128 GB / 256 GB	UFS 3.1
Galaxy S22 Ultra	8 GB / 12 GB	128 GB / 256 GB / 512 GB / 1 TB	UFS 3.1
Ref.			

==== Batteries ====
The S22, S22+, and S22 Ultra contain integral 3,700 mAh, 4,500 mAh, and 5000 mAh Li-Po batteries respectively. The S22 supports wired charging over USB-C at up to 25 W (using USB Power Delivery) while the S22+ and S22 Ultra have faster 45W charging. Tests found there's no significant difference between the 25W and 45W charging speeds. All three have Qi inductive charging up to 15W. The phones also have the ability to charge other Qi-compatible devices from the S22's own battery power, which is branded as "Wireless PowerShare," at up to 4.5W.

	Galaxy S22	Galaxy S22+	Galaxy S22 Ultra
Battery capacity	3,700 mAh	4,500 mAh	5,000 mAh
Wired charging speed	25 W	45 W	
Qi2 wireless charging speed	15 W		
Reverse wireless charging speed	4.5 W		
Ref.			

==== Connectivity ====
All three phones support 5G SA/NSA networks. The Galaxy S22 supports Wi-Fi 6 and Bluetooth 5.2, while the Galaxy S22+ and S22 Ultra support Wi-Fi 6E and Bluetooth 5.2. The S22+ and S22 Ultra models also support Ultra Wideband (UWB) for short-range communications similar to Bluetooth (not to be confused with 5G mmWave, which is marketed as Ultra Wideband by Verizon).

Model	Wi-Fi	Bluetooth	UWB	USB	NFC
Galaxy S22	Wi-Fi 6	5.2	No	USB-C 3.2 (5Gbps)	Yes
Galaxy S22+	Wi-Fi 6E	5.2	Yes	USB-C 3.2 (5Gbps)	Yes
Galaxy S22 Ultra	Wi-Fi 6E	5.2	Yes	USB-C 3.2 (5Gbps)	Yes
Ref.					

==== S Pen ====
The S22 Ultra is the first S series phone to include a built-in S Pen, a hallmark feature of the Galaxy Note series. The S Pen has latency at 2.8 ms, reduced from 26 ms on the Note 20 and 9 ms on the Note 20 Ultra and S21 Ultra (although the S21 Ultra had S Pen functionality, it was not included with the phone), and marked the introduction of an 'AI-based co-ordination prediction system'. The S Pen also supports Air gestures and the Air Action system.

=== Software ===
The S22 phones were released with Android 12 (and One UI 4.1). Samsung Knox is included for enhanced device security, and a separate version exists for enterprise use. Samsung has promised four Android OS upgrades and 5 years of security updates (support ending within 2027).

	Pre-installed OS	OS Upgrades history				End of support
	Pre-installed OS	1st	2nd	3rd	4th	End of support
S22; S22+ S22 Ultra	Android 12 (One UI 4.1)	Android 13 (One UI 5.0); October 2022 (One UI 5.1); February 2023	Android 14 (One UI 6.0); November 2023 (One UI 6.1); May 2024 (One UI 6.1.1); September 2024	Android 15 (One UI 7.0); April 2025	Android 16 (One UI 8.0); October 2025	Within 2027

== Criticism ==
=== Performance throttling controversy ===
Testing performed by benchmarking utility Geekbench and media outlet Android Police reported that Samsung's Game Optimizing Service (GOS) was throttling the performance of the device significantly in a number of popular apps, but allowing it to run unthrottled for benchmarking utilities; one specific test on the S22+, using a copy of Geekbench 5 that was modified to look like Genshin Impact to the GOS, recorded a loss of 45% in single-core performance and 28% in multi-core performance versus an undisguised copy of the utility. In response, Geekbench has permanently delisted the entire S22, S21 and S10 lineup from its service. Samsung has since released an update allowing S22 users to disable GOS on their devices.

== Gallery ==
Galaxy S22 Ultra logo

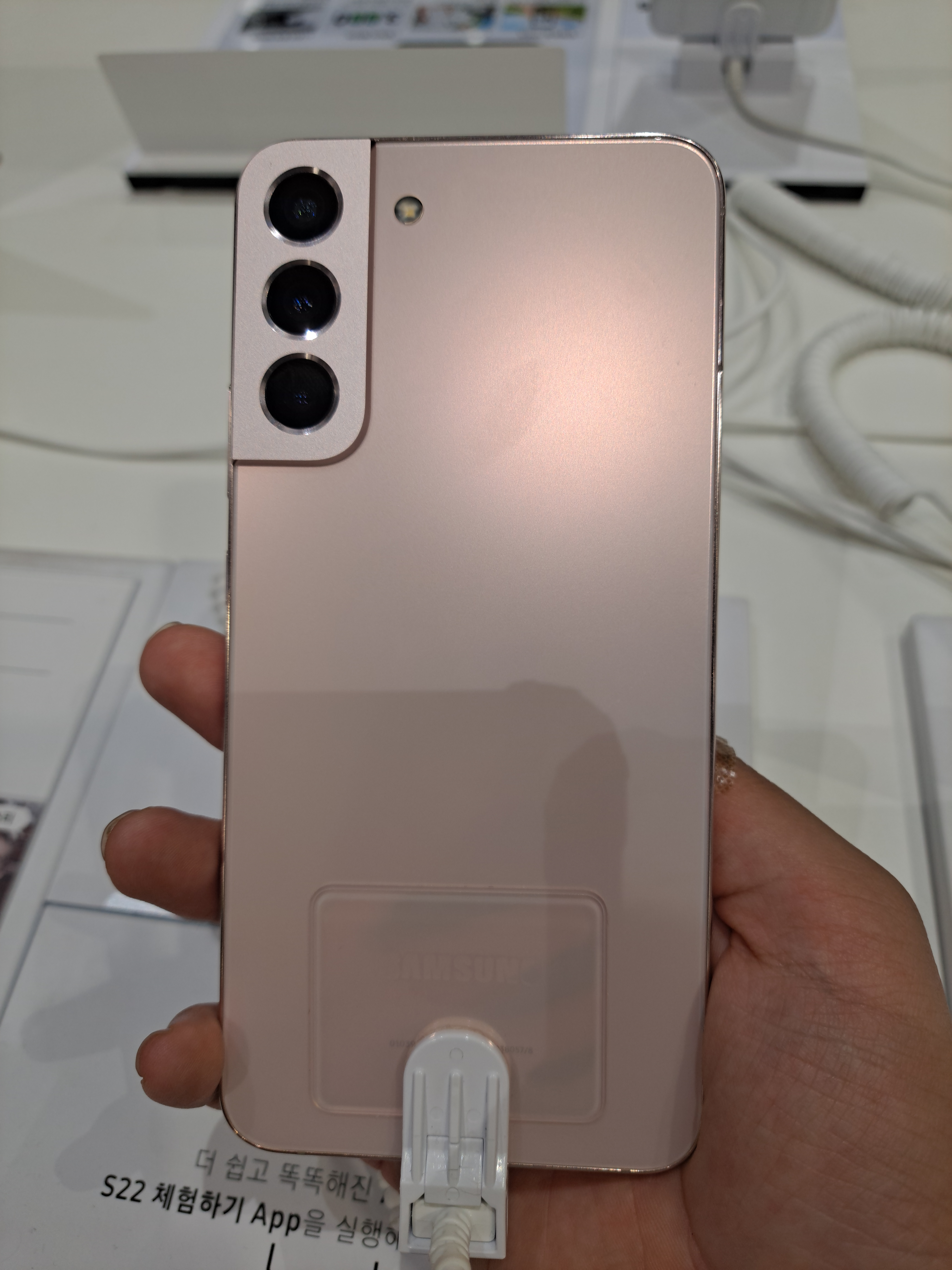
Back of the Galaxy S22

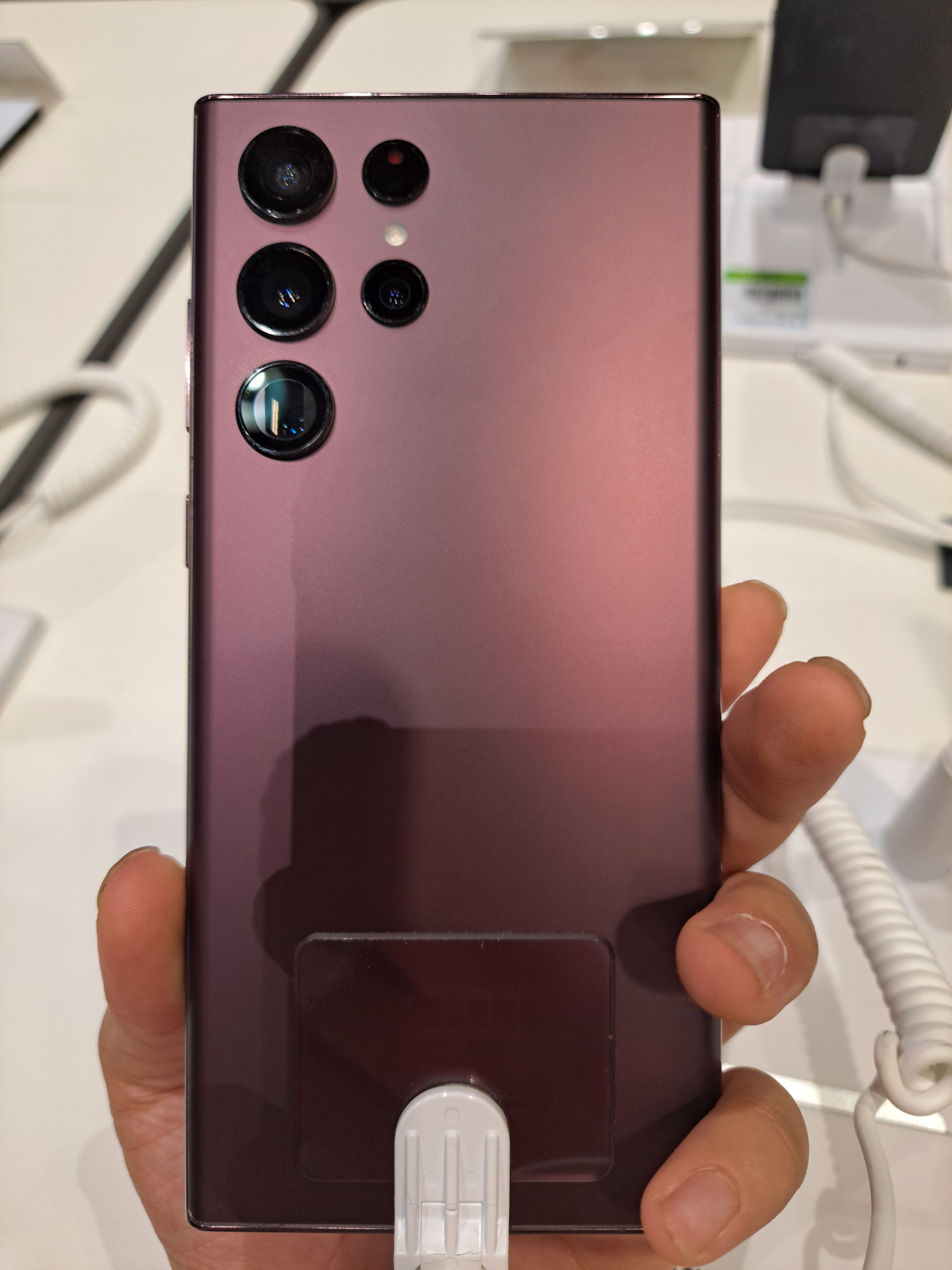
Back of the Galaxy S22 Ultra

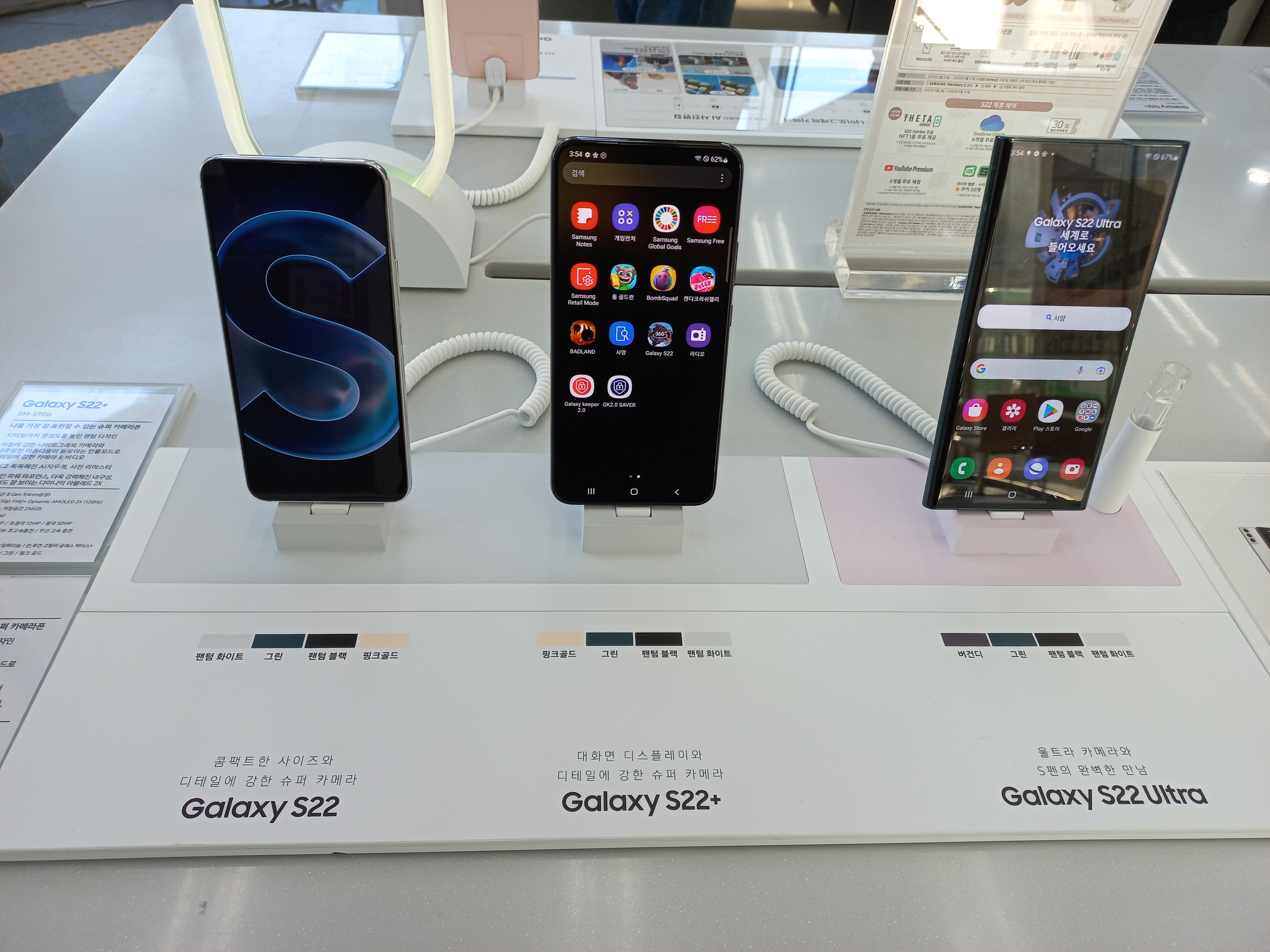
Galaxy S22 series

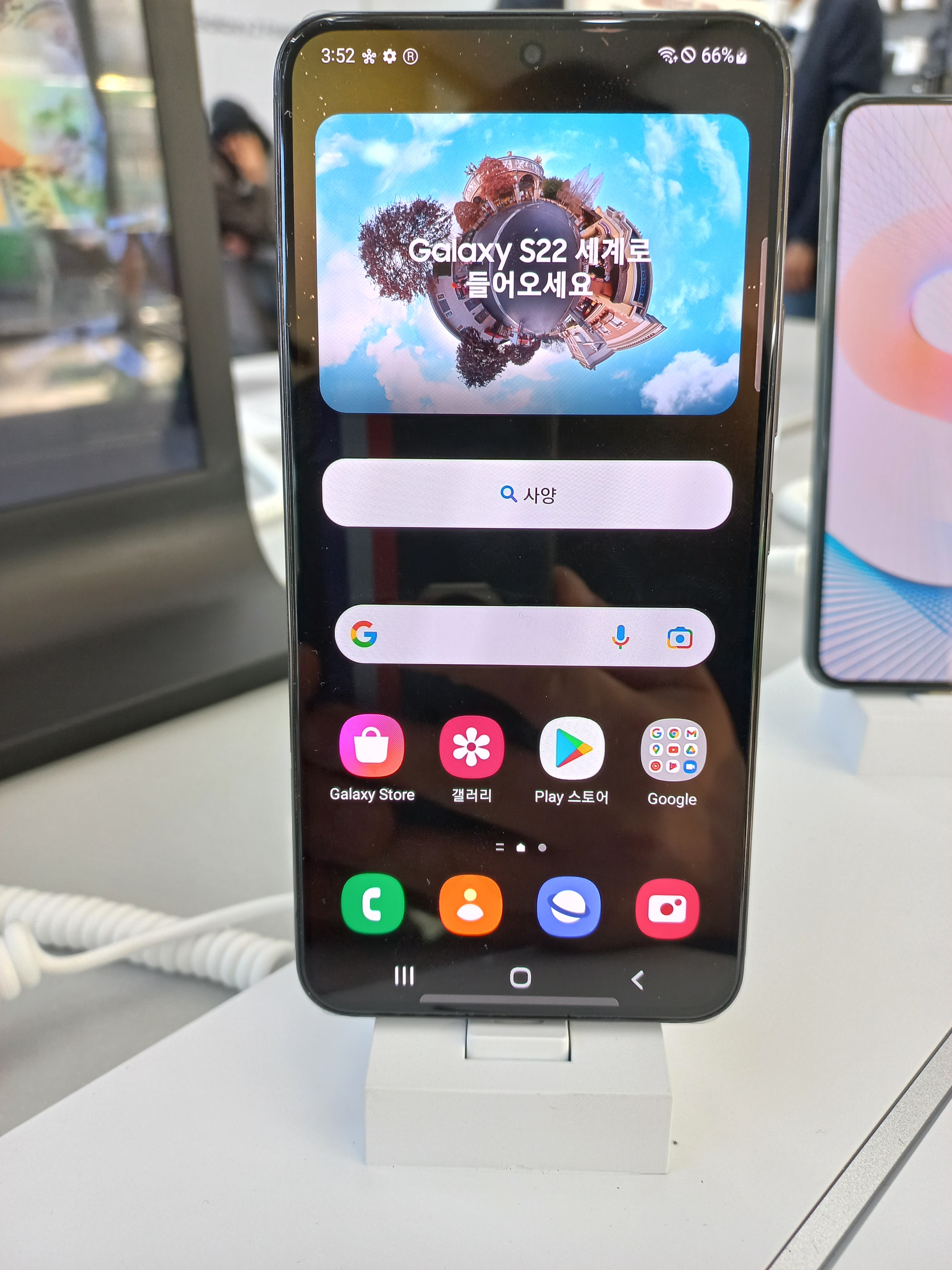
Galaxy S22

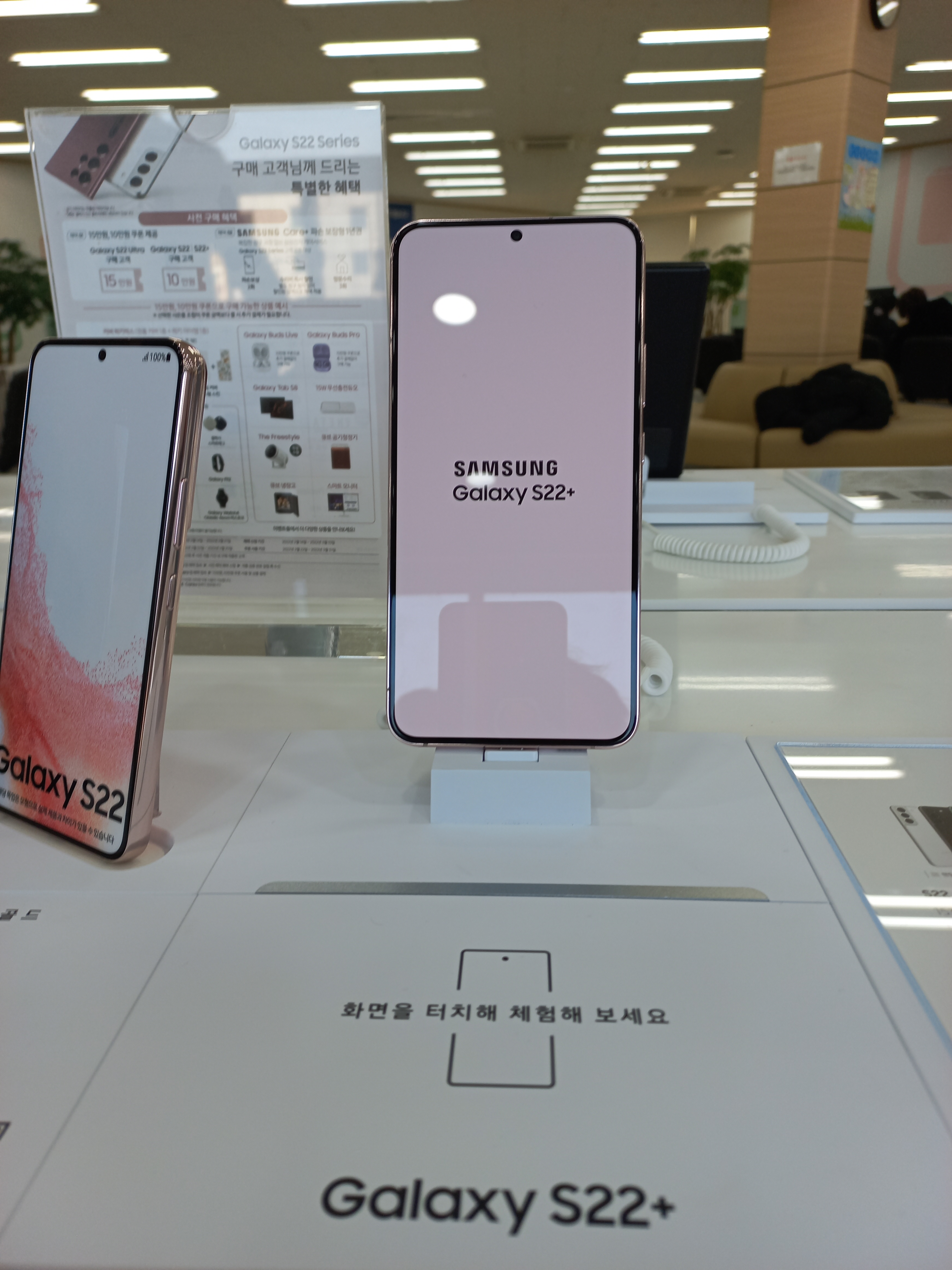
Galaxy S22+

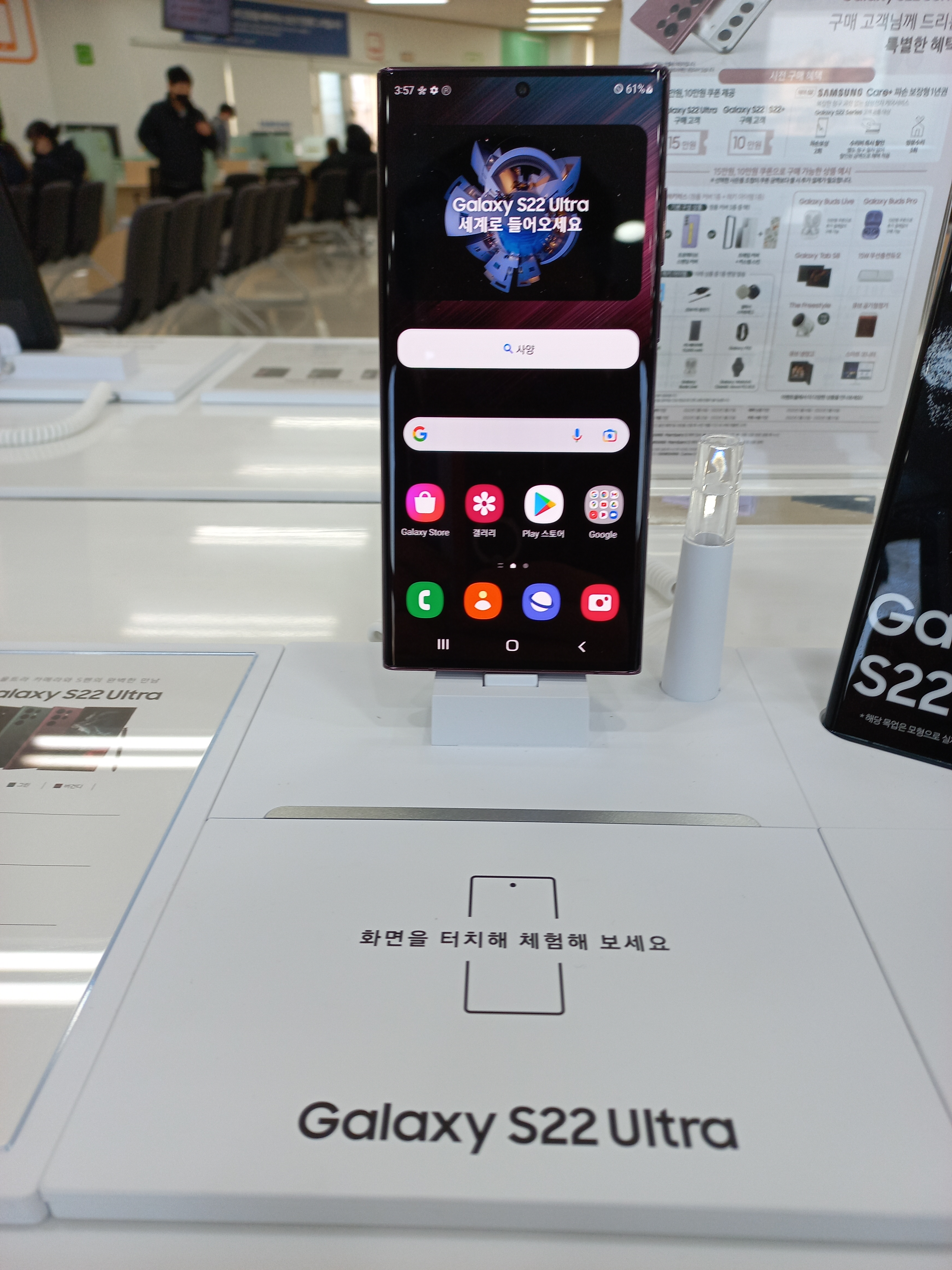
Galaxy S22 Ultra

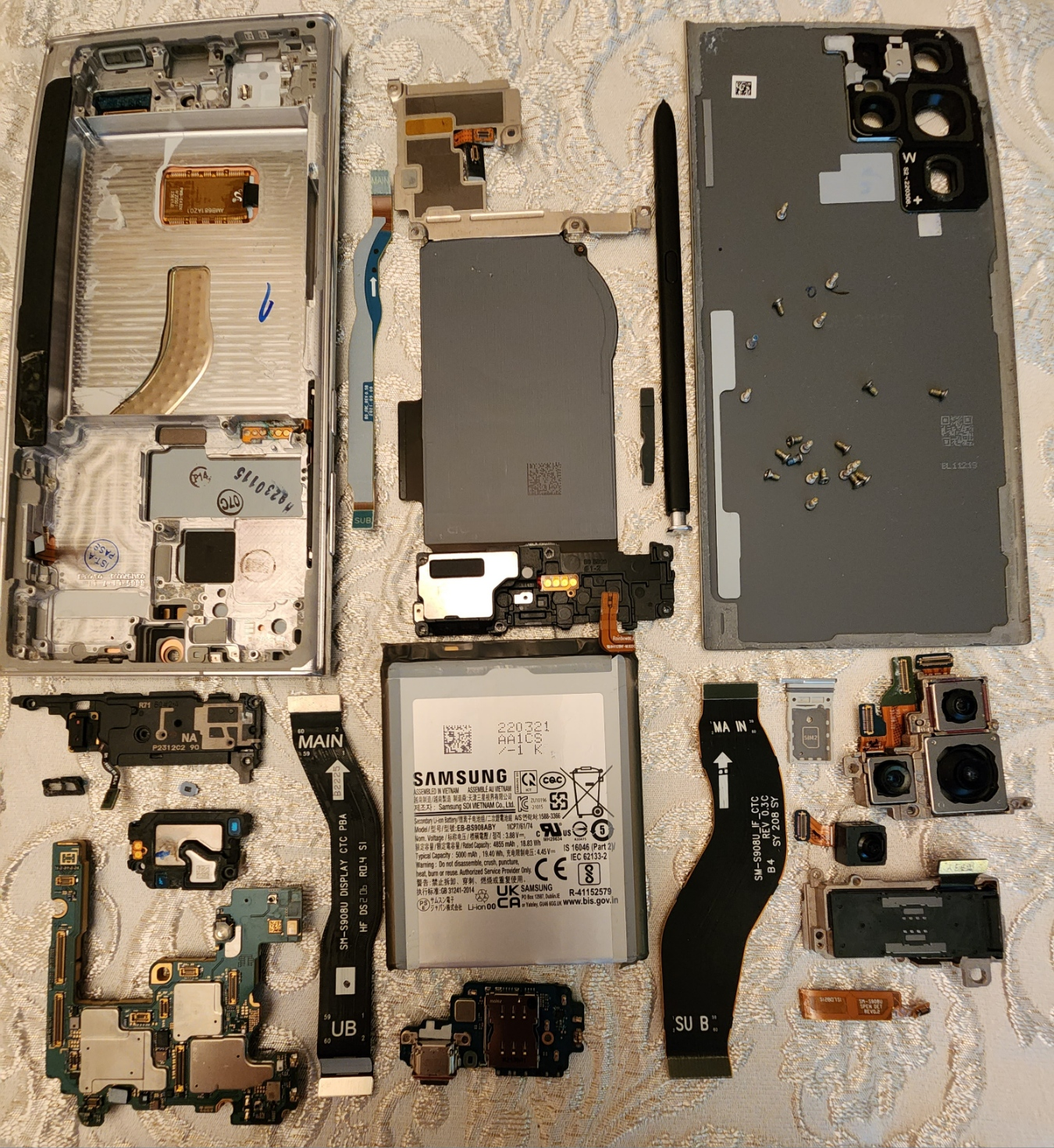
Galaxy S22 Ultra parts

== See also ==
- List of longest smartphone telephoto lenses

Preceded by Samsung Galaxy S21	Samsung Galaxy S22; 2022	Succeeded by Samsung Galaxy S23
