= Folded optics =

Folded optics is an optical system in which the beam is bent in a way to make the optical path much longer than the size of the system. This allows the resulting focal length of the objective to be greater than the physical length of the optical device. Prismatic binoculars are a well-known example. An early conventional film camera (35 mm) was designed by Tessina that used the concept of folded optics.

Fold mirrors are used to direct infrared light within the optical path of the James Webb Space Telescope. These optical fold mirrors are not to be confused with the observatory's deployable primary mirrors, which are folded inward to fit the telescope within the launch vehicle's payload fairing; when deployed, these segments are part of the three-mirror anastigmat design's primary element and don't serve as fold mirrors in the optical sense.

== See also ==
- Periscope lens also called "folded lens"
