= Optical path =

The figure shows the optical path of a Mirau-objective respectively a Mirau-interferometer. Reference beam (4 to 6) and object beam (7) have identical optical path length and can thus cause white light interference.

Optical path (OP) is the trajectory that a light ray follows as it propagates through an optical medium. The geometrical optical-path length or simply geometrical path length (GPD) is the length of a segment in a given OP, i.e., the Euclidean distance integrated along a ray between any two points. The mechanical length of an optical device can be reduced to less than the GPD by using folded optics. The optical path length in a homogeneous medium is the GPD multiplied by the refractive index of the medium.

== Factors affecting optical path ==
Path of light in medium, or between two media is affected by the following:

- Reflection
  - Total internal reflection
- Refraction
- Dispersion of light
- Absorption

== Simple materials used ==
- Lenses
- Prisms
- Mirrors
- Transparent materials (e.g. optical filters)
- Translucent materials (e.g. frosted glass)
- Opaque materials
