= Periscope lens =

Lens assembly with a prism redirecting the light with a 90° angle to the optical axis

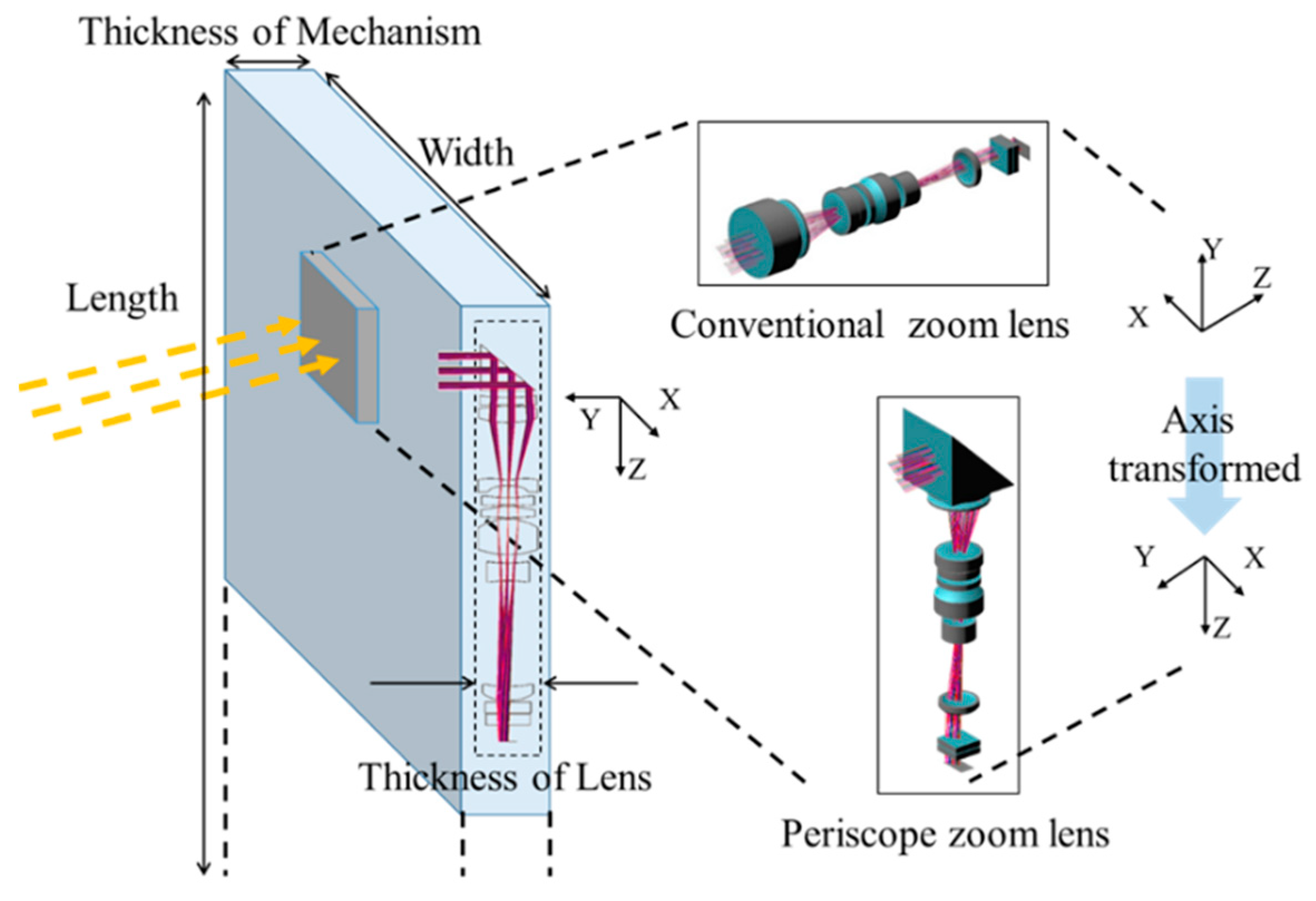
Schematic of a conventional and a periscope zoom lens

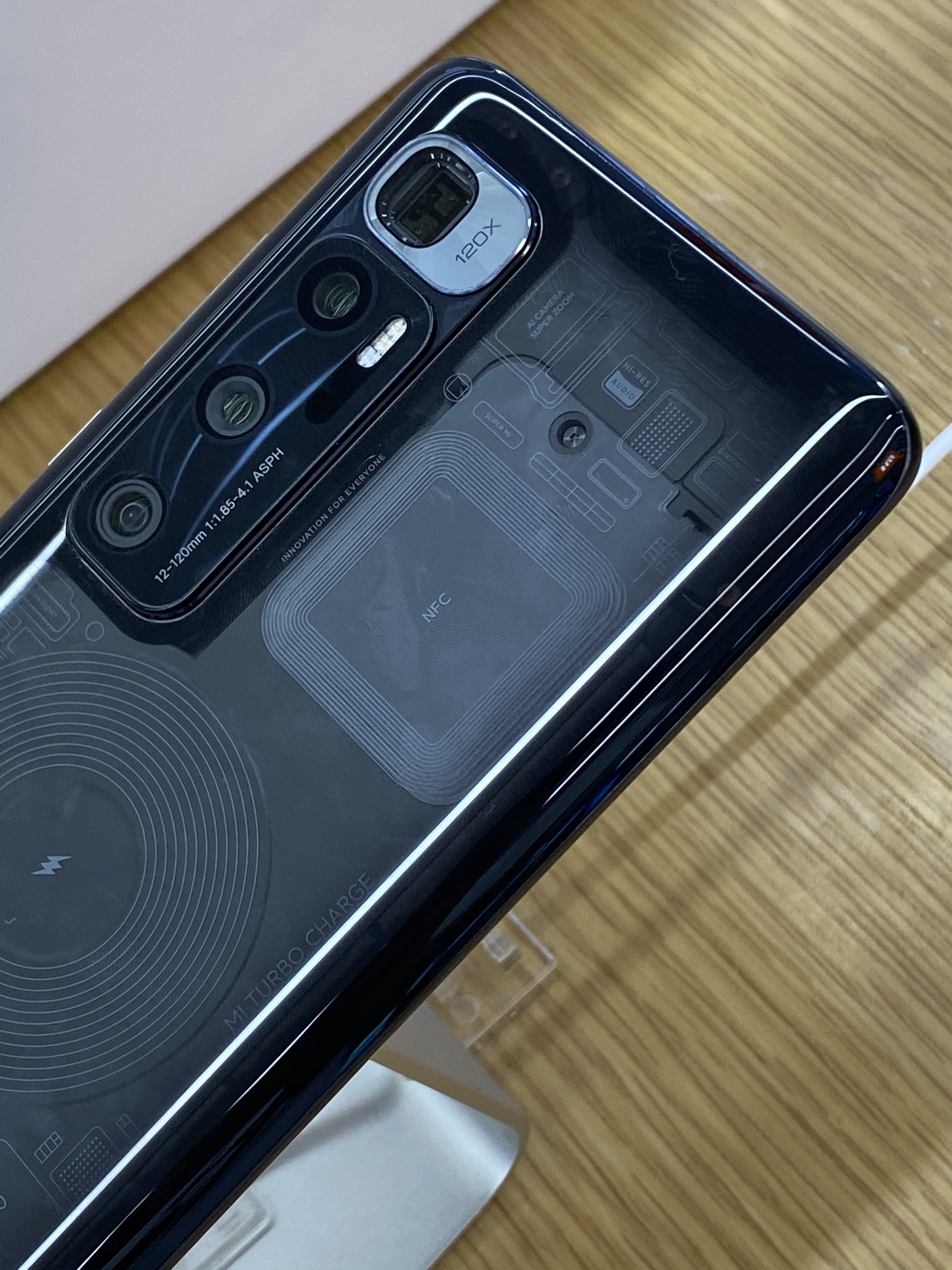
Xiaomi Mi 10 Ultra with a 5x optical zoom periscope lens camera, recognizable by the rectangular shape of its lens

A periscope lens, sometimes called a folded lens, is a mechanical assembly of lens elements that uses a prism or mirror to redirect light through the lenses at a 90° angle to the optical axis, as in a periscope.

== Uses ==
The Kenworthy/Nettmann Snorkel Camera System, introduced in 1967 by N. Paul Kenworthy and Bob Nettmann, uses periscope lenses to allow filming very small scale models and objects from a very close distance. This system uses a full-size movie camera with downward-extending periscope attachment, which has a length of 24 inches (0.61 m) and a diameter of 2 1/2 to 1/2 inch (64 to 13 mm). Similar design is used to allow wide-angle lens protruding from aircraft for aerial cinematography.

Minolta DiMAGE X introduced in 2002 was among the first digital cameras to use a folded lens; that design was later adopted on other compact digital cameras.

Smartphones use periscope lenses to allow larger zoom ratios without increasing their thickness significantly. The increased optical zoom range is aimed to improve macro photography. With a periscope lens, the zoom lenses are turned by 90° and are aligned along the length or the width of the smartphone instead of its depth. The Sharp 902, released in 2004, is sometimes credited to be the first mobile phone to feature a (2x variable zoom) periscope lens camera. The Asus ZenFone Zoom smartphone, released in 2015, used an Hoya dual-periscope lens mechanism to achieve a 3x zoom. In 2019, the Huawei P30 Pro featured a 5x zoom periscope lens. In 2020, the Huawei P40 Pro+ introduced a 10x zoom periscope lens camera.

== See also ==
- Folded optics
- List of longest smartphone telephoto lenses
