= Galaxy AI =

Suite of AI features by Samsung

- Galaxy AI features displayed on various Samsung Galaxy devices
- Developer: Samsung Electronics
- Release: January 17, 2024
- Stable release: Included with One UI 9.0 / May 6, 2026
- Operating system: Android 17 with One UI 9.x Android 16 with One UI 8.x Android 15 with One UI 7 Android 14 with One UI 6.1
- Available in: Arabic, Chinese (China mainland, Hong Kong), Dutch, English (Australia, India, United Kingdom, United States), Filipino, French (Canada, France), German, Gujarati, Hindi, Indonesian, Italian, Japanese, Korean, Polish, Portuguese (Brazil), Romanian, Russian, Spanish (Mexico, Spain, United States), Swedish, Thai, Turkish and Vietnamese
- Type: Artificial intelligence
- License: Proprietary
- Website: Galaxy AI (US)

Galaxy AI is a collection of artificial intelligence (AI) features developed by Samsung Electronics for use in Galaxy-branded mobile devices. First released with the Samsung Galaxy S24 series in January 2024, the system integrates both on-device and cloud-based processing to support features such as language translation, image editing, and content search. These tools operate within various Samsung applications and are intended to assist with everyday tasks.

According to Samsung: "In essence, Bixby is like a personal assistant ready to respond to your verbal commands, while Galaxy AI is like a smart companion that's always working to make your device smarter and your life easier."

== Overview ==
Galaxy AI integrates Samsung's own AI models with external technologies, including Google's Gemini AI, to provide a variety of context-sensitive functions. These include tools for language translation, media editing, and task automation. They are available within specific Samsung applications.

== Languages ==
Since the launch of Galaxy AI, it already supported 24 languages (including dialects). These include:

Launch Date	Languages/Dialects	Ref.
January 17, 2024	Languages: English (US, UK, India), French, German, Italian, Spanish (Spain, Mexico, US), Chinese, Japanese, Korean, Polish, Portuguese (Brazil), Hindi, Thai, Vietnamese	
April 10, 2024	Languages: Arabic, Russian, Indonesian; Dialects: English (Australia), Chinese (Cantonese), French (Canada)	
October 23, 2024	Languages: Turkish, Dutch, Swedish, Romanian; Dialects: Chinese (Traditional), Portuguese (Portugal/Europe)	
October 30, 2025	Languages: Filipino, Gujarati	
October 14, 2026	Languages: Malay, Hungarian	

== Features ==
Galaxy AI includes multiple tools that apply artificial intelligence to specific user tasks, such as communication, notetaking, photography, and productivity. Each tool is categorized by function and operates within Samsung's software environment.

=== Communication ===
Feature	Description
Call Assist	Provides translation-related features within the default Phone app on supported Galaxy devices. It includes Live Translate, which enables two-way voice and text translation during calls, and Text Call, which converts speech into real-time text and generates responses. These tools aim to support communication across different languages and offer alternatives to voice-based interaction. Text Call does not involve AI processing and is available on all devices supporting One UI 6.1 or later.
Call Screening	An AI assistant feature that answers calls from unknown numbers on behalf of the user to identify the caller’s purpose and identity in advance. Call Screening identifies unknown or unrecognized callers and can automatically answer calls on behalf of the user, asking the caller to state their name and purpose. It can be configured in the Samsung Phone app, and displays the call content as real-time text with a summary, allowing the user to filter spam calls and choose whether to answer, decline, or block the call.
Writing Assist	A feature integrated into the Samsung Keyboard that supports tasks such as translation, sentence composition, and text correction. It offers tools for adjusting phrasing, grammar, and tone across supported apps, including messaging and email platforms. Suggested replies may also be generated based on context.
Transcript Assist	A function within the Samsung Voice Recorder app allows recorded speech to be converted into text. It supports additional features such as basic summarization and translation, depending on the content and system configuration. These tools are intended to improve audio processing efficiency within the app.
Interpreter	A translation feature on Galaxy devices running One UI 6.1 or later, offering real-time spoken and on-screen translations for two-way face-to-face conversations. It supports over a dozen languages and includes a screen-flip view so each speaker can read translations in their own language. Offline use is available with downloaded language packs.

=== Personalization ===
Feature	Description
Now Brief	A daily summary interface introduced in One UI 7 and updated in One UI 8. It presents scrollable cards with updates such as weather, calendar events, smart home status, and hydration reminders. One UI 8 added a “Listen Brief” feature using on-device text-to-speech. Now Brief also serves as a visual output surface for Gemini Live, displaying AI-generated summaries and follow-up suggestions in card format. These cards are dynamically updated based on the user's schedule and app usage, and are accessible via the Now Bar. The feature first debuted on the Galaxy S25 series, but with the One UI 8 update, it was also released for the S24 series.
Now Nudge	A Galaxy AI feature that provides context-aware suggestions to streamline tasks such as checking calendars while messaging. Now Nudge analyzes on-screen content in apps, including WhatsApp and surfaces relevant actions without requiring app switching. It may suggest opening the Calendar for dates or the Gallery for photos. The suggestion typically appears above the keyboard to support information recall and autofill.
Now Bar	A customizable toolbar introduced in One UI 7 and updated in One UI 8, offering quick access to live activities, device routines, and app shortcuts. Now Bar includes real-time widgets such as Now Brief cards, and acts as the primary interface for launching Gemini Live. A Gemini Live status indicator (e.g. "listening" or "on hold") may appear on the lock screen, showing session status and offering limited session controls.

=== Productivity ===
Feature	Description
Note Assist	A feature in Samsung Notes that helps summarize content from meetings or lectures into structured formats. It can identify recurring phrases or key points and format them using built-in organization tools. The output may be used for reviewing or sharing, depending on the user's needs.
Document Scan	A feature that extracts and organizes information from scanned documents. It recognizes text, tables, and details such as names and dates, converting them into editable structured data. The feature supports automatic categorization of files including receipts, contracts, and forms. Scanned content can be shared, saved, or summarized within Samsung Notes or other connected applications. This feature first debuted with the release of the Galaxy S26 series
Circle to Search	A gesture-based search function that lets users select on-screen content for related web lookup. It can recognize elements such as products, landmarks, and text, and provides search suggestions within the current interface. This is intended to reduce app switching during contextual queries.
AI Select	A content-based suggestion feature that analyzes what is displayed on screen to offer possible user actions. Examples include suggesting wallpaper settings or creating short video clips from selected media. The feature works within certain Samsung apps and may vary depending on device capabilities.
Browsing Assist	A web summarization feature within the Samsung Internet browser that processes textual content to generate condensed versions. It can also translate supported content and is limited to handling text-based information. The function is intended to assist users in reviewing lengthy web content.

=== Camera ===
Feature	Description
ProVisual Engine	A software-based imaging system applies scene recognition and automated adjustments to improve visual output on supported devices. It can modify parameters such as color balance, brightness, contrast, and noise levels. Manual adjustment tools are also available for users who prefer direct control.
Nightography	A low-light photography function that uses noise reduction and exposure control to support clearer image and video capture in dark settings. It may also apply motion blur reduction depending on the scene and hardware capabilities.

=== Creativity ===
Feature	Description
Creative Studio	A feature that provides generative image creation tools for producing AI-generated images, stickers, and wallpapers. Users can create images from text prompts or photos from the Gallery, for example by turning pictures into stickers that can be used as custom emojis in messaging apps. The feature also supports creating wallpapers and other visual content. It can be accessed through the Edge Panel or the Creative Studio app.
Sketch to Image	An image generation feature that creates visual outputs from user-drawn sketches. It uses generative AI to modify or complete the input and is compatible with tools such as the S Pen. On the Galaxy S25 Ultra, the integrated S Pen can be used to sketch or refine inputs directly. The feature is available in apps including Samsung Gallery and Samsung Notes.
Portrait Studio	A portrait creation feature that generates stylized images from photos or sketches using AI-based image processing. Users can apply effects such as lighting or background adjustments through touch or S Pen input. It can be used together with the Best Face tool, which captures multiple images in succession and enables the selection of preferred facial expressions. The feature is accessible in the Samsung Gallery app.
Generative Edit	An image editing function that allows users to remove objects, expand backgrounds, or resize content using automated generation tools. Modified areas are filled in algorithmically based on surrounding visual context. Related software options such as Expert RAW and Enhance-X offer additional processing functions, including sharpening, noise reduction, and camera shift correction. Hardware specifications also affect the use of generative editing; for example, the Galaxy S25 Ultra includes a 200 MP wide lens, a 50 MP ultrawide lens, and both 10 MP and 50 MP telephoto lenses with up to 5× optical zoom, which can provide higher-resolution source material for editing.
Best Face	A photo optimization feature that automatically selects and composites the most favorable facial expressions of subjects captured in a motion photo. The feature analyzes multiple frames taken in quick succession and identifies faces with open eyes, smiles, or minimal motion blur to generate a single improved image. Processing uses AI-based face detection and frame analysis to compare frames. Best Face can be accessed in the Samsung Gallery app through the “Choose best face” option.
Audio Eraser	A post-processing feature that allows users to remove background noise or specific audio elements—such as voices, wind, or crowd sounds—from recorded videos. It uses AI-based audio separation to isolate and reduce unwanted sound components. While primarily software-driven, supporting systems such as the ProVisual Engine improve visual clarity and reduce noise in source video, indirectly enhancing audio separation accuracy. The feature is available in the Samsung Gallery app and can be accessed during video editing.
Auto Trim	A video editing function that detects and selects portions of footage based on visual or contextual patterns, enabling the assembly of shorter clips without manual editing. It is supported by AI-powered video analytics that assess scene composition and motion. High-resolution recording modes, such as 8K video capture, provide additional flexibility for cropping and reframing segments during editing. Optical Zoom systems included in the S25 series also contribute to framing inputs.
Instant Slo-Mo	A post-processing function that generates slow-motion playback by interpolating additional frames between existing ones. It is activated during video playback in the Gallery app by tapping and holding the screen, without the need for prior selection of a specific recording mode. AI frame interpolation, analyzes consecutive frames and predicts intermediate frames, allowing smooth slow-motion effects even for standard recordings captured at 30 or 60 frames per second. Native high-frame-rate recording, available up to 960fps, enables feature such as Super Slo-Mo. Instant Slo-Mo may be used with Log video, which captures a flat profile for dynamic range, and Galaxy Log, Samsung's AI-based grading tool. These functions allow additional control in post-production.

=== Assist ===
Feature	Description
Bixby	Bixby is a voice recognition–based assistant that allows users to operate Galaxy devices and connected products using spoken commands. It can control smartphone settings, perform searches, manage schedules, and interact with other Samsung devices such as Galaxy Watch and SmartThings home appliances. Bixby also supports Bixby Routines, an automation feature that performs preset actions based on user preferences or contextual triggers. Bixby can be accessed in the device settings through the Advanced Features menu under the Bixby option. With the release of the Galaxy S26 series in February 2026, Perplexity AI has been integrated into the Bixby assistant.
Bixby Vision	Bixby Vision is a visual recognition–based assistant that analyzes visual information captured by the device camera to perform contextual tasks. It identifies objects, text, and scenes to provide related information or execute corresponding actions within supported apps. Bixby Vision can be accessed in the Samsung Camera app through the More tab by selecting the eye-shaped icon displayed on the screen. Functions: Translate: Provides real-time translation by overlaying the translated text on the original image for foreign signs or menus.; Text: Uses optical character recognition (OCR) to copy or share printed text such as from documents or books.; Discover: Searches online for visually similar products or related information, including fashion and furniture items.; Wine: Recognizes wine labels to provide details such as type, origin, average price, and reviews.; Scene Describer: Analyzes images to generate text and audio descriptions of captured scenes, aiding accessibility for users with visual impairments.; Object Identifier: Identifies plants, animals, or landmarks and provides related information such as names or classifications.; Text Reader: Converts recognized text into spoken audio using text-to-speech (TTS).; Color Detector: Identifies and names colors from objects, displaying or reading the color information aloud.
Gemini Live	A multimodal AI feature included in the Galaxy AI suite, powered by Google Gemini. It enables interaction through voice, camera input, and screen sharing, supporting tasks such as object recognition, text translation, and content analysis. The assistant works with supported applications, with direct integration for Samsung apps such as Calendar, Samsung Notes, and Reminders. Responses generated by Gemini Live may appear as Now Brief cards, and the session status can be monitored and managed through Now Bar.
Cross-app Action (Seamless Actions)	A feature that enables certain actions—such as search, translation, or event creation—based on selected text or content across compatible apps. It recognizes contextual elements and presents available options within supported Samsung and third-party applications by integrating Google's advanced AI.

=== Health ===
Feature	Description
Health Assist	A health monitoring function in the Samsung Health app that generates an Energy score based on factors such as sleep quality, activity, and heart rate variability. The score is intended to reflect a user's general condition for daily activity, and is derived from data collected by other Galaxy devices, although only a watch or a smart ring can track sleep.

=== Customization ===
Feature	Description
Generative Wallpaper; Photo Ambient	Two visual customization functions that modify wallpaper appearance using AI-based processing. Generative Wallpaper creates images from user-provided keywords or themes, operating locally on the device. Photo Ambient adjusts wallpaper based on environmental factors such as lighting and time, using preset visual filters. These features leverage on-device AI for privacy-sensitive tasks while utilizing cloud-based AI for complex processing needs.

== Devices ==
Galaxy AI was introduced with the Galaxy S24 series in January 2024 and later extended to other Galaxy models through software updates, with functionality varying by model. Initially, AI features were available at no cost on compatible devices from its launch until the end of 2025. In early 2026, Samsung quietly announced that its AI features would continue to be offered at no cost. Future software updates may add Galaxy AI support to additional devices.

Galaxy AI Compatible Devices
Galaxy S series	Galaxy Z series	Galaxy Tab series	Galaxy A series	Galaxy Wearables
Galaxy S26 series; Galaxy S25 series; Galaxy S24 series; Galaxy S23 series; Galaxy S22 series; Galaxy S21 series	Galaxy Z Fold8, Z Fold8 Ultra, Z Flip8; Galaxy Z TriFold; Galaxy Z Fold7, Z Flip7, Z Flip7 FE; Galaxy Z Fold6, Z Flip6; Galaxy Z Fold5, Z Flip5; Galaxy Z Fold4, Z Flip4; Galaxy Z Fold3, Z Flip3	Galaxy Tab S11/S11 Ultra; Galaxy Tab S10+/S10 Ultra; Galaxy Tab S10 FE/FE+, Tab S10 Lite; Galaxy Tab S9/S9+/S9 Ultra; Galaxy Tab S9 FE/FE+; Galaxy Tab S8/S8+/S8 Ultra; Samsung Galaxy Tab A11/A11+; Samsung Galaxy Tab A9/A9+	Galaxy A57, A56, A55, A54; Galaxy A37, A36, A35, A34; Galaxy A27, A26, A25, A24; Galaxy A17, A16, A15, A14; Galaxy A07	Galaxy Watch9, Watch Ultra 2, Watch8, Watch Ultra, Watch7, Watch6; Galaxy Buds On, Buds4/4 Pro, Buds3/Buds Pro/Buds FE (limited AI-enhanced audio processing)
Note: Italicized signify only a limited number of AI features are compatible for those devices. All Galaxy A and Tab A series devices have limited AI features

== Privacy and ethics ==
Galaxy AI processes sensitive data locally on the device to limit external transmission, while cloud-based computing is used selectively for intensive tasks. According to Samsung, user data is not stored or used to train AI models without explicit permission. The company also outlines principles related to fairness, transparency, and accountability in AI development.
