= Samsung Galaxy Z Fold 6 =

2024 foldable smartphone by Samsung Electronics

Samsung Galaxy Z Fold 6 Samsung Galaxy Z Fold SE

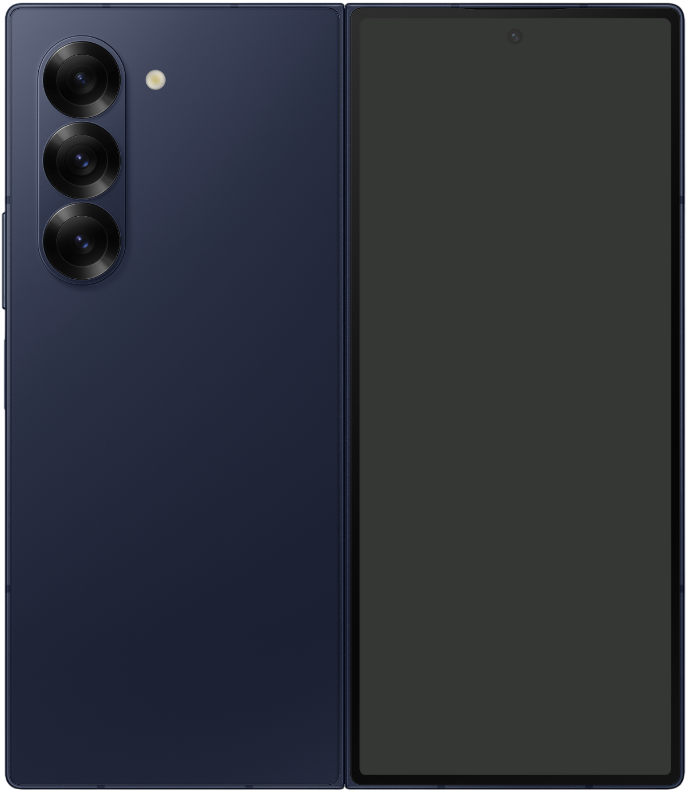
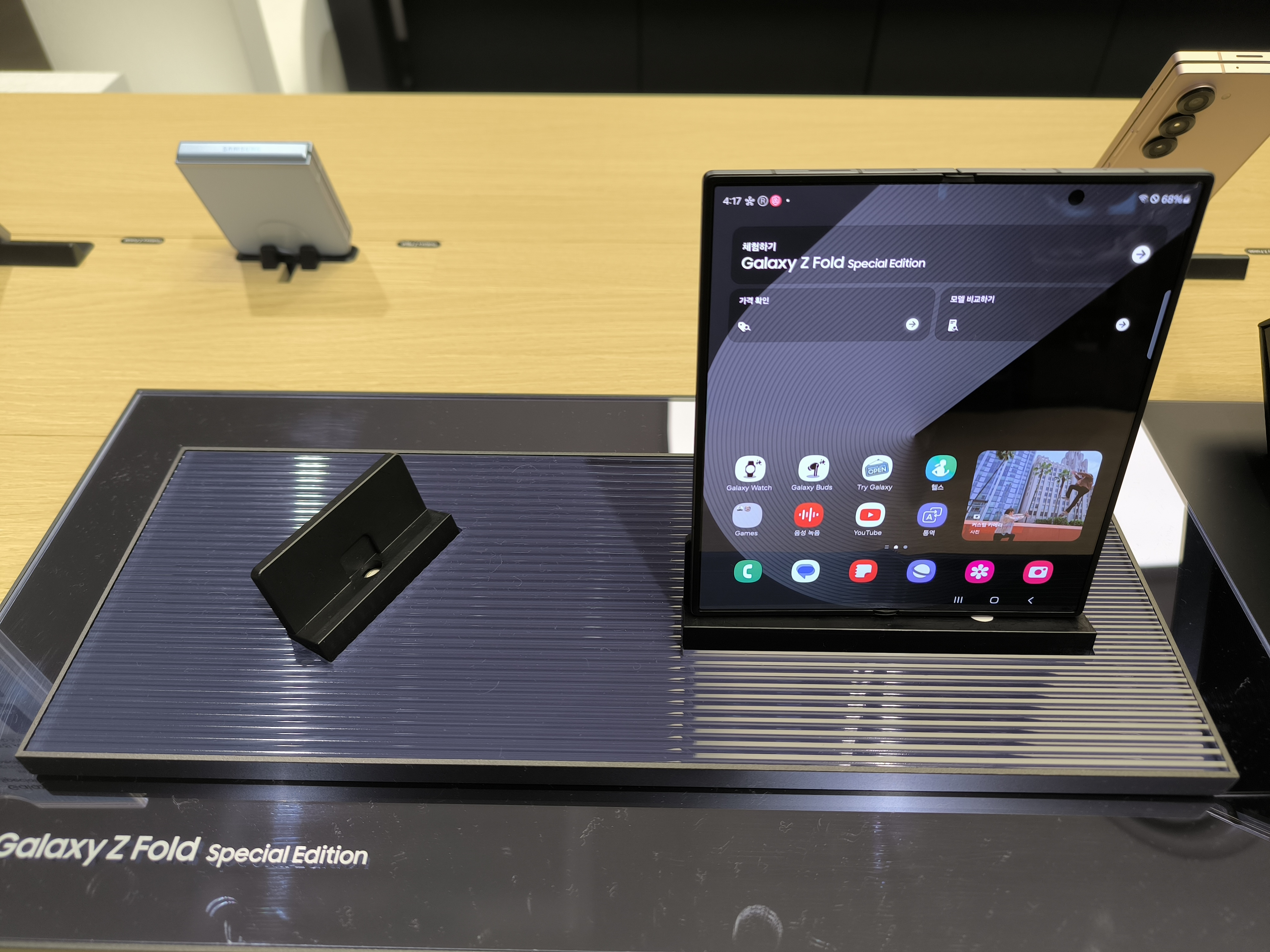
- Samsung Galaxy Z Fold 6 (Navy), unfolded Galaxy Z Fold Special Edition
- Also known as: Samsung Galaxy Fold 6 (in certain European countries)
- Brand: Samsung
- Manufacturer: Samsung Electronics
- Type: Foldable smartphone
- Series: Galaxy Z
- Family: Samsung Galaxy
- First released: Z Fold 6: July 31, 2024; 2 years ago Z Fold SE: October 21, 2024; 2 years ago
- Availability by region: Z Fold 6: July 31, 2024; 2 years ago Z Fold SE: October 21, 2024; 2 years ago
- Discontinued: July 9, 2025; 16 months ago
- Predecessor: Samsung Galaxy Z Fold 5
- Successor: Samsung Galaxy Z Fold 7
- Related: Samsung Galaxy S24; Samsung Galaxy Z Flip 6 Samsung Galaxy Z Flip 7 FE
- Compatible networks: 2G, 3G, 4G, 5G
- Form factor: Folio
- Colors: Silver Shadow, Pink, Navy, Black, White
- Dimensions: Folded: 153.5 mm (6.04 in) H 68.1 mm (2.68 in) W 12.1 mm (0.48 in) D Unfolded: 153.5 mm (6.04 in) H 132.6 mm (5.22 in) W 5.6 mm (0.22 in) D
- Weight: 239 g (8.4 oz)
- Operating system: Original: Android 14 with One UI 6.1.1; Current: Android 17 with One UI 9.0
- System-on-chip: Qualcomm Snapdragon 8 Gen 3 for Galaxy (4 nm)
- CPU: Octa-core (1×3.39 GHz Cortex-X4 & 3×3.1 GHz Cortex-A720 & 2×2.9 GHz Cortex-A720 & 2×2.2 GHz Cortex-A520)
- GPU: Adreno 750 (1 GHz)
- Modem: Qualcomm Snapdragon X70 5G
- Memory: 12 GB LPDDR5X
- Storage: 256 GB, 512 GB, 1 TB (UFS 4.0)
- Battery: Li-Ion 4400 mAh, non-removable
- Charging: 25W Super fast charging 2.0; 15W Fast wireless charging 4.5W Reverse wireless charging
- Rear camera: 50 MP, f/1.8, 23mm (wide), 1.0 μm, dual pixel PDAF, OIS; 10 MP, f/2.4, 66mm (telephoto), 1.0 μm, PDAF, OIS, 3x optical zoom 12 MP, f/2.2, 123°, 12mm (ultrawide), 1.12 μm LED flash, HDR, panorama 8K@30fps, 4K@60fps, 1080p@60/120/240fps (gyro-EIS), 720p@960fps (gyro-EIS), HDR10+
- Front camera: 4 MP, f/1.8, 26 mm (wide), 2.0 μm, under display Cover camera: 10 MP, f/2.2, 24 mm (wide), 1/3", 1.22 μm HDR; 4K@30/60fps, 1080p@30/60fps, gyro-EIS
- Display: Foldable Dynamic LTPO AMOLED 2X, 120Hz, HDR10+, 2600 nits (peak), 7.6 inches (~91.0% screen-to-body ratio), 1856 × 2160 pixels, 20.9:18 aspect ratio, ~374 ppi
- External display: Dynamic LTPO AMOLED 2X, 120Hz, 1600 nits (peak), Corning Gorilla Glass Victus 2, 6.3 inches, 968 × 2376 pixels, 22:9 aspect ratio, 410 ppi
- Sound: Stereo speakers
- Connectivity: Wi-Fi 802.11 a/b/g/n/ac/6e, tri-band, Wi-Fi Direct, Bluetooth 5.3, A2DP, LE, aptX HD, USB Type-C 3.2, OTG
- Water resistance: IP48 (up to 1.5m for 30 minutes)
- Model: USA: SM-F956U; Global: SM-F956B; Korea: SM-F956N
- Codename: Q6

The Samsung Galaxy Z Fold 6 (stylized as Samsung Galaxy Z Fold6) is a foldable smartphone developed by Samsung Electronics. It was officially announced on July 10, 2024, at the Samsung's Galaxy Unpacked event held in Paris, France, alongside the Galaxy Z Flip 6, Galaxy Watch 7, Galaxy Buds 3 series and Galaxy Ring. It succeeded the Galaxy Z Fold 5 and became available on July 31, 2024.

On October 21, 2024, Samsung announced a derivative model, the Galaxy Z Fold SE (Special Edition), featuring a larger display, a slimmer and lighter body, and a 200 MP main camera. This model was released exclusively in South Korea.

The phone has since been succeeded by the Samsung Galaxy Z Fold 7 on July 9, 2025.

== Design ==
Compared to its predecessor, the Galaxy Z Fold 5, the Samsung Galaxy Z Fold 6 features a more squared-off design in its display and body, closely resembling the Galaxy S24 Ultra. The camera rings incorporate concentric circle detailing for a refined aesthetic. The cover screen and back panel are constructed with Corning Gorilla Glass Victus 2, while the inner display uses Samsung's ultra-thin flexible glass (UTG). The device holds an IP48 rating, making it Samsung's first foldable smartphone with certified dust protection. Its frame is made of matte aluminum and does not include a titanium frame, unlike the Galaxy S24 Ultra.

The Z Fold 6 is available in five colors: Silver Shadow, Pink, Navy, Crafted Black, and White. Among these, Crafted Black and White are exclusive to online channels. Notably, the Crafted Black variant features a carbon fiber pattern finish.

Model	Galaxy Z Fold 6	Galaxy Z Fold SE
Base colors	Silver Shadow; Pink; Navy	Crafted Black
Online exclusive colors	Crafted Black; White	—N/a

== Specifications ==
=== Display ===
It features a 6.3-inch cover display and a 7.6-inch main display, both using Dynamic AMOLED 2X technology with a 120Hz adaptive refresh rate and peak brightness of up to 2,600 nits. It supports input from the S Pen Pro and S Pen Fold Edition. However, the device does not include a built-in slot for stylus storage.

The Galaxy Z Fold SE comes with a 6.5-inch outer display and an 8-inch inner display. Unlike the main model, it does not support S Pen input and is only available in South Korea. Other hardware specifications are largely consistent between the two.

Feature	Galaxy Z Fold 6	Galaxy Z Fold SE
Main display size	7.6 inches (190 mm)	8.0 inches (200 mm)
Cover display size	6.3 inches (160 mm)	6.5 inches (170 mm)
Main display	Dynamic AMOLED 2X Infinity Flex & O Display	
Cover display	Dynamic AMOLED 2X Infinity-O Display	
Main resolution	1856 x 2160 (368 ppi)	1968 x 2184 pixels (367 ppi)
Cover resolution	968 x 2376 (410 ppi)	2520 × 1080 (422 ppi)
Main aspect ratio	10:9	
Cover aspect ratio	21:9	
Refresh rate	1–120 Hz (adaptive)	
Peak brightness	2,600 nits	
HDR	HDR10+	
Main protection	Ultra Thin Glass	
Cover protection	Gorilla Glass Ceramic 2	
References		

==== Flex mode ====
Flex Mode is a feature available on both devices that utilizes the device's foldable hinge mechanism to enable split-screen functionality when the device is partially folded, typically between 75 and 115 degrees.

In this configuration, supported applications display content on the upper half of the screen, while interactive controls appear on the lower half. For example, in apps such as YouTube, Samsung Notes, and video conferencing platforms, users can view content or calls on the top screen while accessing playback tools, editing options, or a virtual touchpad below. Flex Mode enables a split-screen interface when the device is partially folded, allowing users to interact with different parts of an application simultaneously. It is designed to support multitasking by utilizing the device's foldable structure.

=== Performance ===
The Galaxy Z Fold 6 is equipped with 12 GB of LPDDR5X RAM and is available in 256 GB, 512 GB, or 1 TB of internal storage. It does not support microSD card expansion. Galaxy Z Fold SE only comes with 12 GB of RAM and 512 GB of internal storage.

=== Battery ===
The Galaxy Z Fold 6 and Galaxy Z Fold SE are equipped with two lithium-ion polymer batteries for a total capacity of 4,400 mAh. These devices support wired charging up to 25 W, wireless charging up to 15 W, and reverse wireless charging at 4.5 W.

=== Camera ===
The Galaxy Z Fold 6 features a triple rear camera system: a 50 MP wide-angle lens with Dual Pixel autofocus and OIS, a 12 MP ultra-wide lens with a 123° field of view, and a 10 MP telephoto lens with 3x optical zoom and OIS. It includes a 10 MP front-facing camera on the cover screen and a 4 MP under-display camera beneath the main display, used for video calls and facial recognition. It's also the last Z Fold to have an under-display camera on its main screen. The Galaxy Z Fold SE shares this setup, except for a 200 MP main sensor. Other components and AI features remain the same.

Samsung's ProVisual Engine, an AI-based image processing system, is included to improve photo quality in various lighting conditions.

Rear camera setup specifications
	Galaxy Z Fold 6	Galaxy Fold SE
Wide	50 MP, f/1.7, 24mm (wide), 1/1.3", 0.6μm, multi-directional PDAF, OIS	200 MP, f/1.8, 24mm (wide), 1/1.3", 0.6μm, multi-directional PDAF, OIS
Telephoto	10 MP, f/2.4, 67mm (telephoto), 1.0μm, PDAF, OIS, 3x optical zoom	
Ultrawide	12 MP, f/2.2, 120˚ (ultrawide), 1.4μm, dual pixel PDAF	
Features	LED flash, HDR, panorama	
Video recording	8K@30fps, 4K@60fps, 1080p@60/120/240fps (gyro-EIS), 720p@960fps (gyro-EIS), 10-bit HDR, HDR10+	

== Software ==
The Galaxy Z Fold 6 and Galaxy Z Fold SE were shipped with Android 14 (and One UI 6.1.1), and are the first Galaxy Z devices (alongside the Galaxy Z Flip 6) eligible for 7 years of updates (OS upgrades and security updates). This version of Samsung's user interface includes software enhancements designed for foldable devices, along with support for Galaxy AI features.

	Pre-installed OS	OS Upgrades history							End of support
	Pre-installed OS	1st	2nd	3rd	4th	5th	6th	7th	End of support
Z Fold 6	Android 14 (One UI 6.1.1)	Android 15 (One UI 7.0); April 2025	Android 16 (One UI 8.0); September 2025 (One UI 8.5); May 2026	Android 17 (One UI 9.0); October 2026					Within 2031
Z Fold SE	Android 14 (One UI 6.1.1)	Android 15 (One UI 7.0); April 2025	Android 16 (One UI 8.0); September 2025 (One UI 8.5); May 2026	Android 17 (One UI 9.0); October 2026					Within 2031

=== Galaxy AI ===
Galaxy AI is a suite of artificial intelligence-powered features integrated into Samsung's software ecosystem. These tools support productivity, communication, photography, and creative tasks, and are available on supported Galaxy devices.

== See also ==
- Samsung Galaxy Z series
- Samsung Galaxy Z Flip 6

Preceded by Samsung Galaxy Z Fold 5	Samsung Galaxy Z Fold 6; 2024	Succeeded by Samsung Galaxy Z Fold 7
