= ProVisual Engine =

AI imaging system by Samsung

The ProVisual Engine is an AI-powered imaging system developed by Samsung Electronics for mobile devices. It was introduced in 2024 with the Galaxy S24 series as a component of Samsung's Galaxy AI ecosystem, providing advanced image processing to enhance image quality in photography and videography.

== Overview ==
The ProVisual Engine processes images using adaptive scene recognition, real-time optimization, and advanced image processing. It adjusts color accuracy, dynamic range, and noise levels, providing both automated and manual controls to accommodate various user preferences.

== Features ==
The ProVisual Engine encompasses several features.

=== Quad Tele System ===
The Quad Tele System features 2x, 3x, 5x, and 10x optical zoom, supported by digital processing to enhance zoom clarity and detail. It incorporates Image Signal Processing (ISP) to refine detail retention, reduce noise, and enhance image clarity at different zoom levels while minimizing distortion.

=== Nightography ===
Nightography utilizes noise reduction techniques and advanced sensor technology to enhance low-light photography. By adjusting exposure and minimizing motion blur, the system helps produce more precise and more detailed images in dark environments for both photos and videos.

=== Generative Edit ===
Generative Edit allows for object removal, background expansion, and intelligent resizing. It reconstructs missing areas by filling backgrounds and completing cut-off objects, adjusting composition while preserving image integrity and refinement.

=== Expert RAW ===
Expert RAW allows users to capture RAW images directly from the camera app for advanced shooting and editing. It includes HDR (High Dynamic Range) support to enhance detail and dynamic range. The ProVisual Engine utilizes multi-frame processing to generate RAW images with increased clarity and depth for post-processing.

=== Enhance-X and Camera Shift ===
Enhance-X is an AI-based image processing tool that applies upscaling, noise reduction, and sharpening. Its Camera Shift feature adjusts the perceived camera height by modifying framing and proportions. A recent update extended support to human and pet images.

== Compatible devices ==
As of 2025, the ProVisual Engine is available on the following devices:

=== Galaxy S series ===
- Galaxy S26 Series (Galaxy S26, S26+. S26 Ultra)
- Galaxy S25 Series (Galaxy S25, S25+, S25 Edge, S25 Ultra, S25 FE)
- Galaxy S24 Series (Galaxy S24, S24+, S24 Ultra)

=== Galaxy Z series ===
- Galaxy Z Fold 7
- Galaxy Z Flip 7, Z Flip 7 FE
- Galaxy Z Fold 6
- Galaxy Z Flip 6

=== Galaxy Tab S series ===
- Galaxy Tab S10 series (Tab S10+, Tab S10 Ultra)
- Galaxy Tab S9 series (Tab S9, Tab S9+, Tab S9 Ultra)

=== Galaxy Z series ===
- Galaxy Z Fold 7, Z Flip 7, Z Flip 7 FE
- Galaxy Z Fold 6, Z Flip 6

=== Galaxy Tab S series ===
- Galaxy Tab S10 series (Tab S10+, Tab S10 Ultra)
- Galaxy Tab S9 series (Tab S9, Tab S9+, Tab S9 Ultra)

ProVisual Engine features by device
Device	Quad Tele System	Nightography	Generative Edit	Expert RAW & Enhance-X	Camera Shift
Galaxy S series
S26 Ultra	2x, 3×, 5×, 10x	Yes	Yes	Expert RAW; Enhance-X (AI sharpening)	Yes
S26+	3x	Yes	Yes	Expert RAW; Enhance-X (AI sharpening)	Yes
S26	3x	Yes	Yes	Expert RAW; Enhance-X (AI sharpening)	Yes
S25 Ultra	2×, 3×, 5×, 10×	Yes	Yes	Expert RAW; Enhance-X (AI sharpening)	Yes
S25	3x	Yes	Yes	Expert RAW; Enhance-X	Yes
S25+	2x	Yes	Yes	Expert RAW; Enhance-X	Yes
S25 Edge	2x	Yes	Yes	Expert RAW; Enhance-X	Yes
S25 FE	3x	Yes	Yes	Expert RAW; Enhance-X	Yes
S24 Ultra	2×, 3×, 5×, 10×	Yes	Yes	Expert RAW; Enhance-X (AI sharpening)	Yes
S24	–	Yes	Yes	Expert RAW; Enhance-X	Yes
S24+	–	Yes	Yes	Expert RAW; Enhance-X	Yes
Galaxy Z series
Z Fold 7	–	Yes	Yes	Yes	Yes
Z Flip 7	–	Yes	Yes	Yes	Yes
Z Flip 7 FE	–	Yes	Yes	Yes	Yes
Z Fold 6	–	Yes	Yes	Yes	Yes
Z Flip 6	–	Yes	Yes	Yes	Yes
Galaxy Tab S series
Tab S10 Ultra	–	Yes	Yes	Enhance-X only	Yes
Tab S10+	–	Yes	Yes	Enhance-X only	Yes
Tab S10	–	Yes	Yes	Enhance-X only	Yes
Tab S9 Ultra	–	Yes	Yes	Enhance-X only	Yes
Tab S9+	–	Yes	Yes	Enhance-X only	Yes
Tab S9	–	Yes	Yes	Enhance-X only	Yes

- Note: Quad Tele System refers to the multi-telephoto setup (2×, 3×, 5×, 10×) available only on the Ultra models (S24 Ultra and S25 Ultra).
- Note: On Galaxy Tab models, only Enhance-X editing features are supported; the Expert RAW camera app is not available.
