= Samsung Notes =

Software application

- Samsung Notes main screen on a Galaxy smartphone
- Developer: Samsung Electronics
- Release: August 19, 2016
- Stable release: 4.4.30.81 / 29 September 2025
- Operating system: Microsoft Windows, Android
- Type: Note-taking software, integrated software
- Website: www.samsung.com/ae/apps/samsung-notes/
- As of: November 4, 2025

Samsung Notes File Format
- Filename extension: .snb .spd
- Developed by: Samsung
- Initial release: 2011; 15 years ago (SNB) 2013; 13 years ago (SPD)
- Type of format: Notetaking file format
- Extended to: DOC, WordProcessingML, PPT, TXT, SPD

Samsung Notes (Korean: 삼성 노트) is a note-taking application for Android and Microsoft Windows developed by South Korean company Samsung Electronics. It allows the writing of digital and handwritten notes with embedded photos and audio, sketching and drawing, and also functions as a PDF document reader and annotater.

Samsung Notes is offered freely and is distributed on the Galaxy Store, Google Play Store and Microsoft Store. It is officially only supported on Samsung's own Android devices, but on Windows PCs is no longer restricted to Samsung's devices since 2025.

== History ==
Samsung Notes was launched in 2016 as a single replacement of several older memo and illustration apps on Galaxy Note devices: namely S Note, Scrapbook, Memo, and Action Memo.

On October 3, 2023, it was revealed that Samsung Notes will forcibly stop working on Windows devices unless it is a Galaxy Book. In May 2025, it was reported that Samsung now allows the software to run on all Windows computers, although the Samsung Account app from the Microsoft Store is required for the backend to function.

Samsung also offered Samsung Notes Viewer, a tool specifically for viewing Notes files and until One UI 6 an app called Write on PDF for annotating PDF documents.

== Features ==
Samsung Notes features handwriting to text conversion, note tagging, and sharing in PDF, Microsoft Word, Microsoft PowerPoint and image files. PDF importing and annotating, as well as importing sound recordings (Audio Bookmark) were introduced with the One UI 2.5 update.

Shared Notebooks in Samsung Notes can be shared with others in a user's contactbook or using a direct URL; the recipients are also able to modify and collaborate on a Shared Notebook. Live collaboration between multiple users was added in One UI 5.1. The software also allows securing a note or document using a password or fingerprint.

Using the screen off memo feature, users can write using an S Pen without turning the device screen on, which is then saved onto Samsung Notes.

Google Gemini integration with Samsung Notes was introduced in 2025. With the One UI 8 update in 2025, Samsung Notes was updated to support the ability to create notes in landscape mode.

=== Galaxy AI Features ===
Samsung Notes includes a set of Galaxy AI–based functions on supported Galaxy devices, such as the Galaxy S25 series, Galaxy Z Fold 7, Galaxy Z Flip 7, and recent Galaxy Tab models. These tools provide automated text processing, summarization, formatting, and drawing-related capabilities within the application.

- Gemini Live: A voice-interaction tool on supported Galaxy devices that can send basic commands to Samsung Notes, such as creating a note or inserting generated text.
- Note Assist: Provides two tools for managing long notes. Auto Format reorganizes unstructured text into more structured layouts, while Summarize generates a shorter version of the content with key points.
- Transcript Assist: Converts voice recordings inserted into Samsung Notes into text, which can be summarized, translated, or reorganized. Transcripts created in the Voice Recorder app can also be sent to Samsung Notes, and the feature supports speaker separation and editable text output.
- Writing Assist: Provides real-time tools for rewriting, translating, and editing text while typing in a note. It operates as an inline assist panel, similar to chat-based assistants, and complements Note Assist, which handles longer-form tasks such as formatting or summarizing full notes.
- Drawing Assist:Converts user sketches into generated images by selecting an area and choosing a style such as watercolor, illustration, or cartoon. The resulting images can be inserted, copied, or used to replace the original sketch, and can be moved or resized within the note.

== Synchronisation ==
Notes content are synchronised automatically with the cloud, i.e. Samsung Cloud. Since 2020, Samsung Notes can also be synchronised with Microsoft OneNote so that they can be viewed on PCs.

== Reception ==
Lifewire called Samsung Notes "a repository for all notes, in any form", and listed its synchronisation as a positive point. It listed the lack of home screen shortcuts as a disadvantage, as well as the fact access to secured notes are denied temporarily when inputting a wrong password. The website MakeUseOf commented that it "stands out among Android note-taking apps, and its Windows version is equally impressive". However it criticised the fact it is only available for Samsung Windows devices.

TechRadar's Brian Turner felt that Samsung Notes was "as much as an all-purpose sketchbook as a notepad." depending on purpose. In a 2020 review of the Galaxy Note 20 Ultra, David Phelan of Forbes magazine commented that "in Samsung Notes it has the best app the company has built."

== See also ==
- Comparison of notetaking software
- List of PDF software
- List of personal information managers
- S Pen
