= Samsung Galaxy Z Fold 7 =

2025 foldable smartphone by Samsung Electronics

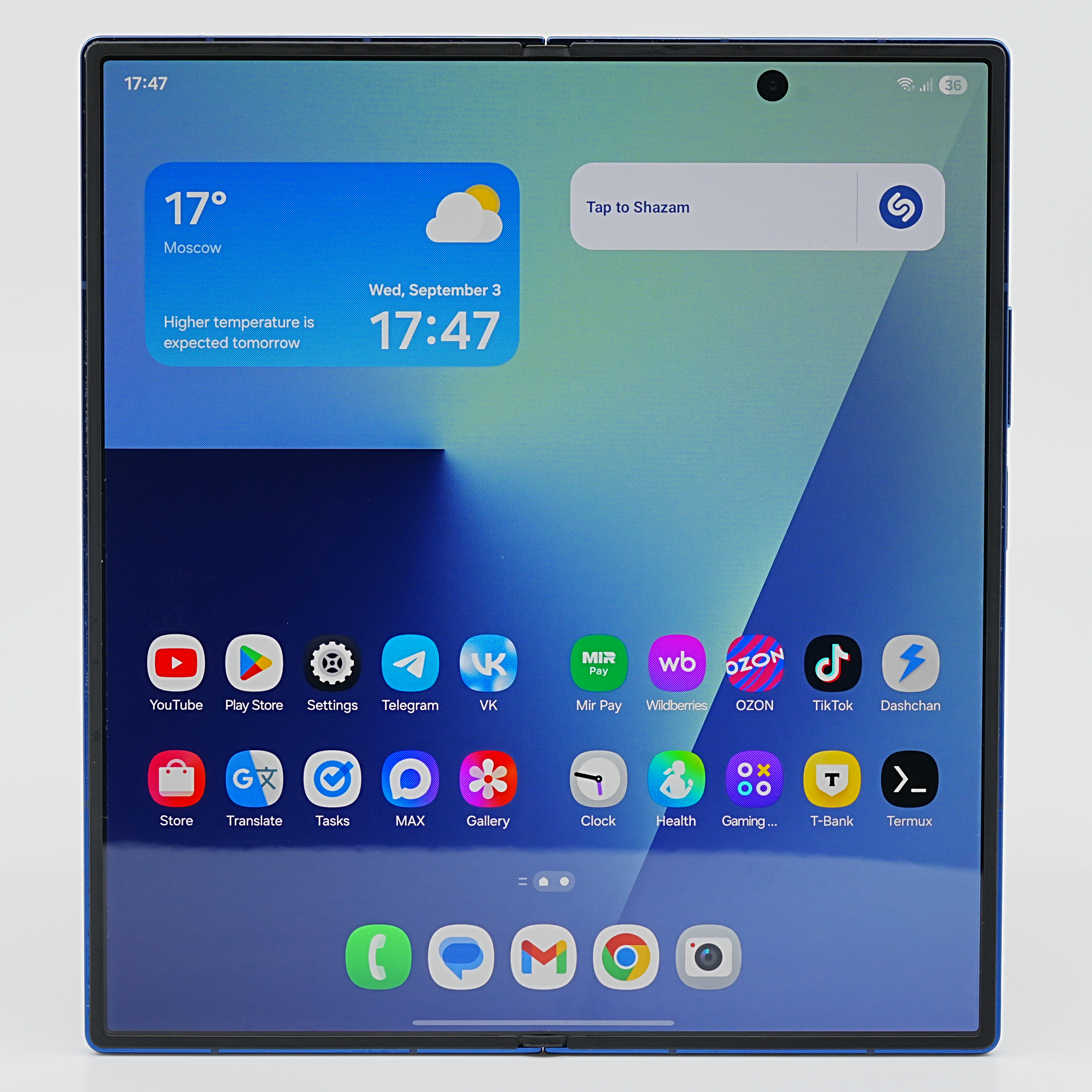
- Samsung Galaxy Z Fold 7 in Blue Shadow showing the main screen
- Also known as: Samsung Galaxy Fold 7 (in certain European countries)
- Brand: Samsung
- Manufacturer: Samsung Electronics
- Type: Foldable smartphone
- Series: Galaxy Z
- Family: Samsung Galaxy
- First released: July 25, 2025; 15 months ago
- Availability by region: July 25, 2025; 15 months ago
- Discontinued: July 22, 2026; 3 months ago
- Predecessor: Samsung Galaxy Z Fold 6
- Successor: Samsung Galaxy Z Fold 8
- Related: Samsung Galaxy S25; Samsung Galaxy Z Flip 7 Samsung Galaxy Z Flip 7 FE; Samsung Galaxy Z TriFold
- Compatible networks: 2G / 3G / 4G / 5G
- Form factor: Foldable (book-style)
- Colors: Jet Black; Blue; Silver Shadow; Mint
- Dimensions: Folded: 158.4 mm (6.24 in) H 72.8 mm (2.87 in) W 8.9 mm (0.35 in) D Unfolded: 158.4 mm (6.24 in) H 143.2 mm (5.64 in) W 4.2 mm (0.17 in) D
- Weight: 215 g (7.58 oz)
- Operating system: Original: Android 16 with One UI 8 Current: Android 17 with One UI 9
- System-on-chip: Qualcomm SM8750-AC Snapdragon 8 Elite (3 nm)
- CPU: Octa-core (2x4.47 GHz Oryon V2 Phoenix L + 6x3.53 GHz Oryon V2 Phoenix M)
- GPU: Adreno 830 (1200 MHz)
- Memory: 12GB, 16GB
- Storage: 256GB, 512GB, 1TB
- SIM: Dual Nano-SIM + multiple eSIM (region dependent)
- Battery: 4,400 mAh dual battery
- Charging: 25W wired (50% in 30 min); 15W wireless 4.5W reverse wireless
- Rear camera: 200 MP, f/1.7, 24 mm (wide), 1/1.3", 0.6 μm, multi-directional PDAF, OIS; 10 MP, f/2.4, 67 mm (telephoto), 1.0 μm, PDAF, OIS, 3x optical zoom 12 MP, f/2.2, 120° (ultrawide), 1.4 μm, dual pixel PDAF; LED flash, HDR, panorama 8K@30fps, 4K@60fps, 1080p@60/120/240fps (gyro-EIS), 720p@960fps (gyro-EIS), 10-bit HDR, HDR10+
- Front camera: 10 MP, f/2.2, 18 mm (ultrawide), 1.12 μm Cover camera: 10 MP, f/2.2, 24 mm (wide), 1.12 μm HDR; 4K@30/60fps, 1080p@30/60fps, gyro-EIS
- Display: Foldable Dynamic LTPO AMOLED 2X, 120Hz, HDR10+, 2600 nits (peak), 8.0 inches, 204.2 cm2 (~90.0% screen-to-body ratio), 1968 x 2184 pixels, 1.11:1 aspect ratio, ~368 ppi
- External display: Dynamic LTPO AMOLED 2X, 120Hz, Corning Gorilla Glass Ceramic 2 6.5 inches, 1080 x 2520 pixels, 21:9 aspect ratio, 422 ppi
- Sound: Stereo speakers
- Connectivity: Wi-Fi 802.11 a/b/g/n/ac/6e/7, tri-band, Wi-Fi Direct; Bluetooth 5.4, A2DP, LE, aptX HD; GPS, GALILEO, GLONASS, BDS, QZSS; USB Type-C 3.2, OTG
- Water resistance: IP48 (up to 1.5m for 30 min)
- Model: SM-F966
- Website: Samsung Galaxy Z Fold7 (US)

The Samsung Galaxy Z Fold 7 (stylized as Samsung Galaxy Z Fold7) is an Android-based foldable smartphone manufactured, developed and marketed by Samsung Electronics. It was officially announced on July 9, 2025, at the Samsung's Galaxy Unpacked event held in Brooklyn, New York City, United States, alongside the Galaxy Z Flip 7 (and its FE model) and the Galaxy Watch 8 series, and were released on July 25, 2025.

The Galaxy Z Fold 7 has been succeeded by the Samsung Galaxy Z Fold 8 series on July 22, 2026.

== History ==
Many of the Galaxy Z Fold 7 features and design changes were leaked prior to the official launch, including renders of the device being thinner than the Z Fold 6. In May 2025, A picture was posted showing the back of the Galaxy Z Fold 7. SamMobile obtained the CAD renders for the phone, reportedly measuring 4.54mm when unfolded and 9mm when folded, which is significantly thinner than the Z Fold 6. The Z Fold 7's design was officially teased in a video on June 3, 2025, which carried the tagline “the Next Chapter of Ultra.” A picture was posted showing the promotional stand for the Galaxy Z Fold 7 in June 2025, The colors of the phones were leaked, confirming the colors of the Z Fold 7, and the Galaxy Unpacked dates were leaked, confirming the launch date. Final renders for the phone were leaked in June 2025, confirming the new design.

On July 3, 2025, A picture was posted showing the actual Galaxy Z Fold 7 along with its box, a week before the official launch, confirming the thinness of the device.

== Design ==
The Galaxy Z Fold 7 features updated dimensions and weight compared to its predecessor, the Galaxy Z Fold 6. When folded, it measures approximately 158.4 × 72.6 × 8.9 mm, and when unfolded, it measures 158.2 × 143 × 4.2 mm. The device weighs approximately 215 grams, making it the lightest and thinnest model in the Samsung Galaxy Z Fold line-up to date. These changes result from further refinements to the hinge and frame design, while maintaining the book-style folding format that defines the series.

At launch, the Galaxy Z Fold 7 is available in three standard color options: Jet Black, Blue Shadow, and Silver Shadow. A fourth variant, Mint, is available exclusively through Samsung's online store.

Model	Galaxy Z Fold 7
Base colors	Jet Black; Blue; Silver Shadow
Online exclusive color	Mint

== Specifications ==
=== Display ===
The Z Fold 7 features two Dynamic AMOLED 2X displays. The cover display measures 6.5 inches and has a resolution of 2520 × 1080 pixels, now adopting a 21:9 aspect ratio, offering a wider viewing experience than its predecessor. The main foldable display measures 8.0 inches and has a resolution of 2184 × 1968 pixels, and can reach up to 2,600 nits of brightness under specific conditions, such as when using Vision Booster in direct sunlight.

Feature		Galaxy Z Fold 7
Display size	Main	8.0 inches (203.1 mm)
Display size	Cover	6.5 inches (164.8 mm)
Display Type	Main	Dynamic AMOLED 2X Infinity Flex & O Display
Display Type	Cover	Dynamic AMOLED 2X Infinity-O Display
Resolution	Main	2184 × 1968
Resolution	Cover	2520 × 1080
Aspect Ratio	Main	10:9
Aspect Ratio	Cover	21:9
Protection	Main	Ultra Thin Glass, Anti-Reflection coating
Protection	Cover	Gorilla Glass Ceramic 2
Others	Refresh rate	1–120 Hz (adaptive)
Others	Peak brightness	2,600 nits
Others	HDR	HDR10+
Ref.		

==== Flex mode ====
Flex Mode is a feature on the Galaxy Z Fold 7 that uses the device's foldable hinge to enable split-screen functionality when the device is partially folded, typically between 75 and 115 degrees.

In this configuration, supported applications display content on the upper half of the screen, while interactive controls appear on the lower half. For example, in apps such as YouTube, Samsung Notes, and video conferencing apps, users can view content or calls on the top screen while accessing playback tools, editing options, or a virtual touchpad below.

Flex Mode is intended to support multitasking by allowing simultaneous interaction with different parts of an application through the device's foldable form factor.

=== Performance ===
The Galaxy Z Fold 7 is powered by the Snapdragon 8 Elite chipset, manufactured using a 3 nm process. Its octa-core CPU includes two high-performance Oryon V2 cores clocked at 4.47 GHz and six efficiency cores clocked at 3.53 GHz. The chipset's GPU supports hardware-accelerated graphics and AI processing, which are utilized in tasks such as gaming and multitasking.

It comes with 12 GB of LPDDR5X RAM on standard models, while the 1 TB variant includes 16 GB of RAM. Storage options include 256 GB, 512 GB, and 1 TB, utilizing UFS 4.0 technology.

=== Battery ===
The Galaxy Z Fold 7 is powered by a dual 4,400 mAh battery, and supports 25 W wired charging, 15 W fast wireless charging, and 4.5 W reverse wireless charging.

=== Camera ===
The Galaxy Z Fold 7 features a triple rear camera system, comprising a 200 MP wide-angle sensor (similar to the Galaxy Z Fold SE), a 12 MP ultra-wide lens, and a 10 MP telephoto lens with 3× optical zoom. For selfies and video calls, it includes a 10 MP cover camera and a 10 MP hole-punch camera on the main display.

Image processing is handled by Samsung's ProVisual Engine, an image signal processor (ISP) that supports always-on 10-bit HDR+ color, applies noise reduction, and enables video capture in low-light conditions. It also performs motion detection and scene analysis to automatically adjust camera settings based on the subject and lighting conditions.

Camera Type	Galaxy Z Fold 7
Wide	200 MP (f/1.8)
Ultra-wide	12 MP (f/2.2)
Telephoto	10 MP (3×) (f/2.4)
Front camera	10 MP (f/2.2)
Additional features	2× optical quality zoom Sensor-size & pixel-binning Super Steady mode (with Horizon Lock)
The device supports 8K video recording at up to 30 fps

== Software ==
The Galaxy Z Fold 7 ships with Android 16 and One UI 8. Alongside the Galaxy Z Flip 7, it is promised to get up to seven years of operating system and security updates, which is a policy first introduced with the Galaxy S24 series.

	Pre-installed OS	OS Upgrades history							End of support
	Pre-installed OS	1st	2nd	3rd	4th	5th	6th	7th	End of support
Z Fold 7	Android 16 (One UI 8.0) Minor One UI update: (One UI 8.5); May 2026	Android 17 (One UI 9.0); September 2026							Within 2033

=== Galaxy AI ===
The Galaxy Z Fold 7 supports a range of Galaxy AI features optimized for its foldable form factor, including Generative Edit, which allows users to remove or move objects by tapping and holding on them. This feature utilizes the main display and Flex Mode to support image editing with a larger viewing area and layout flexibility when the device is unfolded.

== See also ==
- Samsung Galaxy Z series
- Samsung Galaxy Z Flip 7
- Samsung Galaxy Z Flip 7 FE
- Samsung Galaxy Z TriFold

Preceded by Samsung Galaxy Z Fold 6	Samsung Galaxy Z Fold 7; 2025	Succeeded by Samsung Galaxy Z Fold 8
