= Samsung Galaxy Buds On =

2026 clip-on wireless earbuds by Samsung Electronics

- Developer: Samsung Electronics
- Manufacturer: Samsung Electronics
- Product family: Samsung Galaxy
- Type: Wireless earbuds
- Released: October 27, 2026 (South Korea)
- System on a chip: Qualcomm Snapdragon S7 Gen 1 Sound Platform
- Connectivity: Bluetooth 6.2
- Weight: 6.65 g per earbud 41 g charging case
- Model Number: SM-U600
- Related: Samsung Galaxy Buds 4

The Samsung Galaxy Buds On is an open-ear wireless earbuds developed and manufactured by Samsung Electronics. Announced on October 1, 2026, they are the first Galaxy Buds line-up to use a clip-on form factor, in which the earbud wraps around the outer ear instead of sealing the ear canal.

It was released first in South Korea on October 27, 2026, which would then be followed by United States on the end of November 2026, and in Europe by early 2027.

== History ==
Prior to the release of the Galaxy Buds On, every Galaxy Buds model that were released features earbuds that seal the ear canal. Early signs of a new Galaxy Buds model, with a model number SM-U600 appeared on the U.S. FCC on September 15, 2026. This hinted that a new separate line of Galaxy Buds would be released and would be distinct from the previously released Galaxy Buds models.

Renders of the supposed earbuds first appeared in an internal code in the Galaxy Buds Manager app, which shows a design similar to Huawei's FreeClip and in a black color.

Samsung eventually announced the earbuds on October 1, 2026, on the same day as the Galaxy Tab S12 series and the Galaxy SmartTag 3, but without a dedicated launch event. The company positioned the model as a complement to its in-ear earbuds line up, recommending the regular Galaxy Buds models for focused listening and the Galaxy Buds On for situations such as outdoor running where the user still needs to be aware of their surroundings.

== Specifications ==
The earbuds houses a rounded driver and a touch panel (the latter similar to the other Galaxy Buds models), both of which are joined by a flexible band. It uses a clip-on design which rests on the ear and leaves the ear canal open. The company claims that it studied various ear shapes and ran simulations in order to find the correct position for its speaker and battery.

Playback (and call) controls operate by tapping the touch area on the rear side of the earbuds, similar to the other Galaxy Buds models. The earbuds carry an IP54 rating for dust and splash resistance. The charging case has a similar design to the ones used on the Galaxy Buds 4, which also supports wireless charging.

=== Audio ===
Each earbud houses an 11.3 mm (0.44 in) driver that features a TwinBoost speaker, which increases the bass, preventing audio leakage. It also features an automatic volume adjustment, which adapts to the surrounding environment.

The earbuds are powered by the Qualcomm Snapdragon S7 Gen 1 Sound Platform, which is then paired with a Class D amplifier. The earbuds connect over Bluetooth 6.2 and supports the Samsung Seamless Codec, alongside with AAC, SBC and LC3.

=== Software ===
Also similar to the other Galaxy Buds models, it also supports Galaxy AI. It also supports Gemini Live, voice memos through Bixby, and head gestures (such as nodding or shaking the head to accept or decline calls).
