= Samsung Galaxy Z Fold 4 =

2022 foldable smartphone by Samsung Electronics

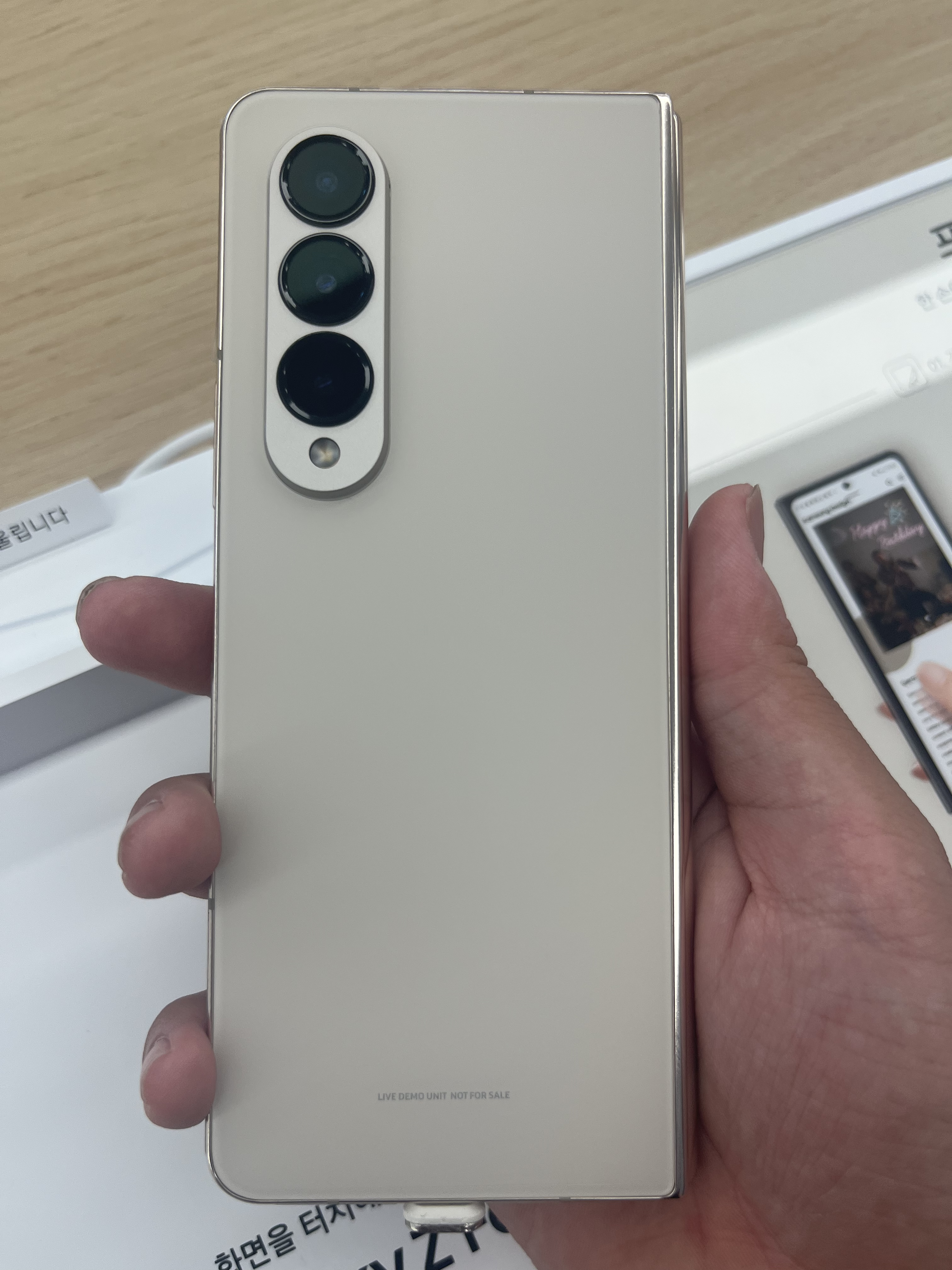
- Also known as: Samsung Galaxy Fold 4 (in certain European countries)
- Brand: Samsung
- Manufacturer: Samsung Electronics
- Type: Foldable smartphone
- Series: Galaxy Z
- Family: Samsung Galaxy
- First released: August 25, 2022; 4 years ago
- Availability by region: August 25, 2022; 4 years ago
- Discontinued: July 26, 2023; 3 years ago
- Predecessor: Samsung Galaxy Z Fold 3
- Successor: Samsung Galaxy Z Fold 5
- Related: Samsung Galaxy S22; Samsung Galaxy Z Flip 4
- Compatible networks: GSM / CDMA / HSPA / EVDO / LTE / 5G
- Form factor: Foldable slate
- Colors: Graygreen, Phantom Black, Beige, Burgundy
- Dimensions: Folded: 155.1 mm (6.11 in) H 67.1 mm (2.64 in) W 14.2–15.8 mm (0.56–0.62 in) D Unfolded: 155.1 mm (6.11 in) H 130.1 mm (5.12 in) W 6.3 mm (0.25 in) D
- Weight: 263 g (9.3 oz)
- Operating system: Original: Android 12L with One UI 4.1.1; Current: Android 16 with One UI 8
- System-on-chip: Qualcomm Snapdragon 8+ Gen 1
- CPU: Octa-core (1x 3.19 GHz Cortex-X2 & 3x 2.75 GHz Cortex-A710 & 4x 2.0 GHz Cortex-A510)
- GPU: Adreno 730
- Memory: 12 GB RAM
- Storage: 256 GB, 512 GB and 1 TB UFS 3.1
- Removable storage: Non-expandable
- SIM: Nano-SIM and eSIM
- Battery: 4400 mAh
- Charging: USB PD: 25W (PPS), 15W (non-PPS); Fast wireless charging 15W; Reverse wireless charging 4.5W
- Rear camera: 50 MP, f/1.8, 24mm (wide), 1/1.76", 1.0μm, Dual Pixel PDAF, OIS; 10 MP, f/2.4, 52mm (telephoto), 1/3.6", 1.0μm, PDAF, OIS, 3x optical zoom 12 MP, f/2.2, 123°, 12mm (ultrawide), 1.12μm LED flash, HDR, panorama 8K@24fps, 4K@60fps, 1080p@60/240fps (gyro-EIS), 720p@960fps (gyro-EIS), HDR10+
- Front camera: 16 MP, f/1.8, 1.0μm, under display Cover camera: 10 MP, f/2.2, 24mm (wide), 1/3", 1.22μm
- Display: Dynamic AMOLED 2X; 2176 × 1812, 7.6 in (19.3 cm), ~6:5 aspect ratio, 373 ppi, HDR10+, 120 Hz refresh rate, 1200 nits (peak)
- External display: Dynamic AMOLED 2X; 2316 × 904, 6.2 in (15.7 cm), ~23.1:9 ratio, 401 ppi, 120 Hz refresh rate, 1000 nits (peak), Corning Gorilla Glass Victus+
- Sound: Stereo speakers
- Connectivity: Wi-Fi 802.12 7, dual-band, Wi-Fi Direct, hotspot Bluetooth 5.2, A2DP, LE, aptX HD; A-GPS, GLONASS, GALILEO, BDS
- Data inputs: Multi-touch screen; USB Type-C 3.2; Fingerprint scanner; Accelerometer; Gyroscope; Proximity sensor; Compass; Barometer
- Water resistance: IPX8 (up to 1.5m for 30 mins
- Model: International models: SM-F936x (last letter varies by carrier and international models); Japanese models: SCG16 (au); SC-55C (NTT Docomo)
- SAR: 0.96 W/kg (head); 0.92 W/kg (body)
- Website: Galaxy Z Fold 4

The Samsung Galaxy Z Fold 4 (stylized as Samsung Galaxy Z Fold4, sold as Samsung Galaxy Fold 4 in certain territories) is an Android-based foldable smartphone developed and marketed by Samsung Electronics, as part of its Galaxy Z series. It was announced on August 10, 2022 at the Samsung's Galaxy Unpacked event, alongside the Galaxy Z Flip 4 and the Galaxy Watch 5, and released subsequently on August 25, 2022, as the successor to the Galaxy Z Fold 3.

The Galaxy Z Fold 4 was succeeded by the Galaxy Z Fold 5 on July 26, 2023.

== Specifications ==
=== Design ===
The Z Fold 4's outer display and back panel use Gorilla Glass Victus+, whilst the foldable inner display is made of Samsung's proprietary "Ultra-Thin Glass" with two protective PET plastic layers covering it, the top of which is a replaceable screen protector.

The Z Fold 4 has an IPX8 ingress protection rating for water resistance, with dust resistance not being rated. The outer frame is constructed from aluminum, marketed as 'Armor Frame' by Samsung.

The Samsung Galaxy Z Fold 4 is available in four colors: Phantom Black, Beige, Graygreen and Burgundy.

Model	Galaxy Z Fold 4
Base colors	Phantom Black; Beige; Graygreen; Burgundy

=== Hardware ===
The Galaxy Z Fold 4 has two screens: its 6.2-inch external cover display and its foldable 7.6-inch inner display featuring support for the S Pen Pro and the S Pen Fold Edition, with both running at 120 Hz and including support for variable refresh rate to help maximize power efficiency.

Compared to the prior generation Z Fold 3, the inner display now has a slightly more square aspect ratio (~6:5 vs ~5:4) due to the external cover display being made moderately wider by about +3 mm; along with both it and the actual phone itself being made ever so slightly shorter. Both of these changes end up combining for a notably wider and thus closer to "traditional phone shaped" ~23.1:9 aspect ratio on the external cover display when it's folded, as compared to the Fold 3's notably narrower ~24.5:9.

The device has 12 GB of RAM, and either 256 GB, 512 GB or 1 TB of UFS 3.1 flash storage, with no support for expanding the device's storage capacity via micro-SD cards.

The Z Fold 4 is powered by the Qualcomm Snapdragon 8+ Gen 1.

The device's included battery is a 4400 mAh dual-cell unit that fast charges via USB-C up to 25 W, or via wireless charging up to 15 W.

The Z Fold 4 features three rear cameras, including a 50 MP wide-angle camera, a 12 MP ultra-wide camera, and a 10 MP telephoto camera. The wide camera shares its sensor with the S22 and S22+, replacing the previous 12 MP sensor, and the telephoto camera has been upgraded from 2x to 3x optical zoom. It has two front-facing cameras, with a 10 MP camera on the cover display and a 4 MP under-display camera on the right half of the inner display, which now has a less visibly apparent display covering with almost double the pixel density of the previous model.

=== Software ===
The Samsung Galaxy Z Fold 4 ships with Android 12L based One UI 4.1.1. They enabled a couple of new "Labs" features for multi-window fans. With these new options enabled, users can now swipe the corner of an app inward to enable Pop-Up View. They can also swipe from the edges of the screen using two fingers to enable multi-window mode on the fly. It was eligible for 4 Android OS upgrades and 5 years of security updates (until 2027).

	Pre-installed OS	OS Upgrades history				End of support
	Pre-installed OS	1st	2nd	3rd	4th	End of support
Z Fold 4	Android 12L (One UI 4.1.1)	Android 13 (One UI 5.0); November 2022 (One UI 5.1); February 2023	Android 14 (One UI 6.0); Dectember 2023 (One UI 6.1); May 2024 (One UI 6.1.1); September 2024	Android 15 (One UI 7.0); May 2025	Android 16 (One UI 8.0); October 2025	Within 2027

== Gallery ==
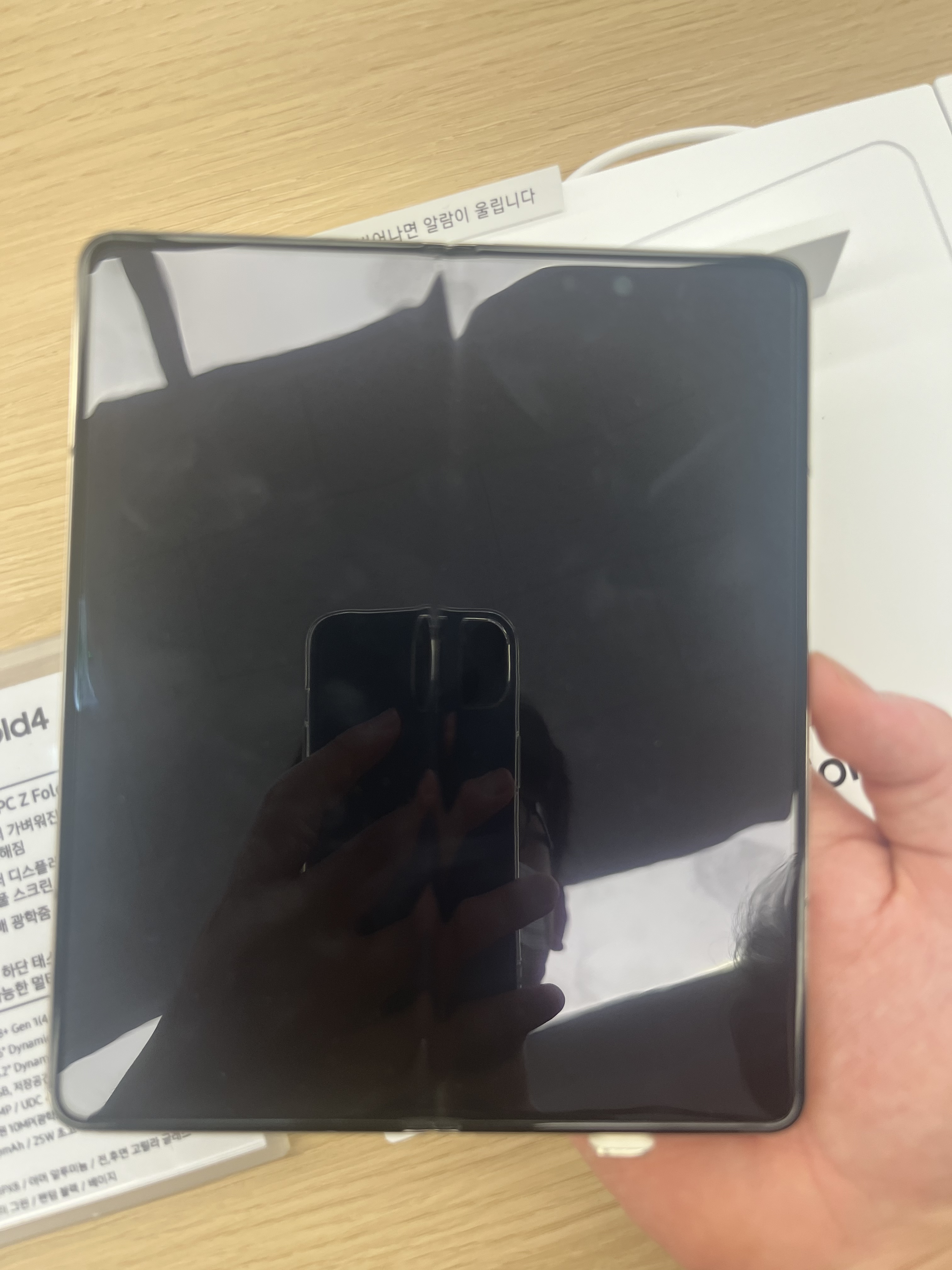
Front of the Samsung Galaxy Z Fold 4

== See also ==
- Samsung Galaxy Z series
- Samsung Galaxy Z Flip 4

Preceded by Samsung Galaxy Z Fold 3	Samsung Galaxy Z Fold 4; 2022	Succeeded by Samsung Galaxy Z Fold 5
