= Samsung Galaxy S25 =

2025 flagship smartphones by Samsung Electronics

Samsung Galaxy S25 series

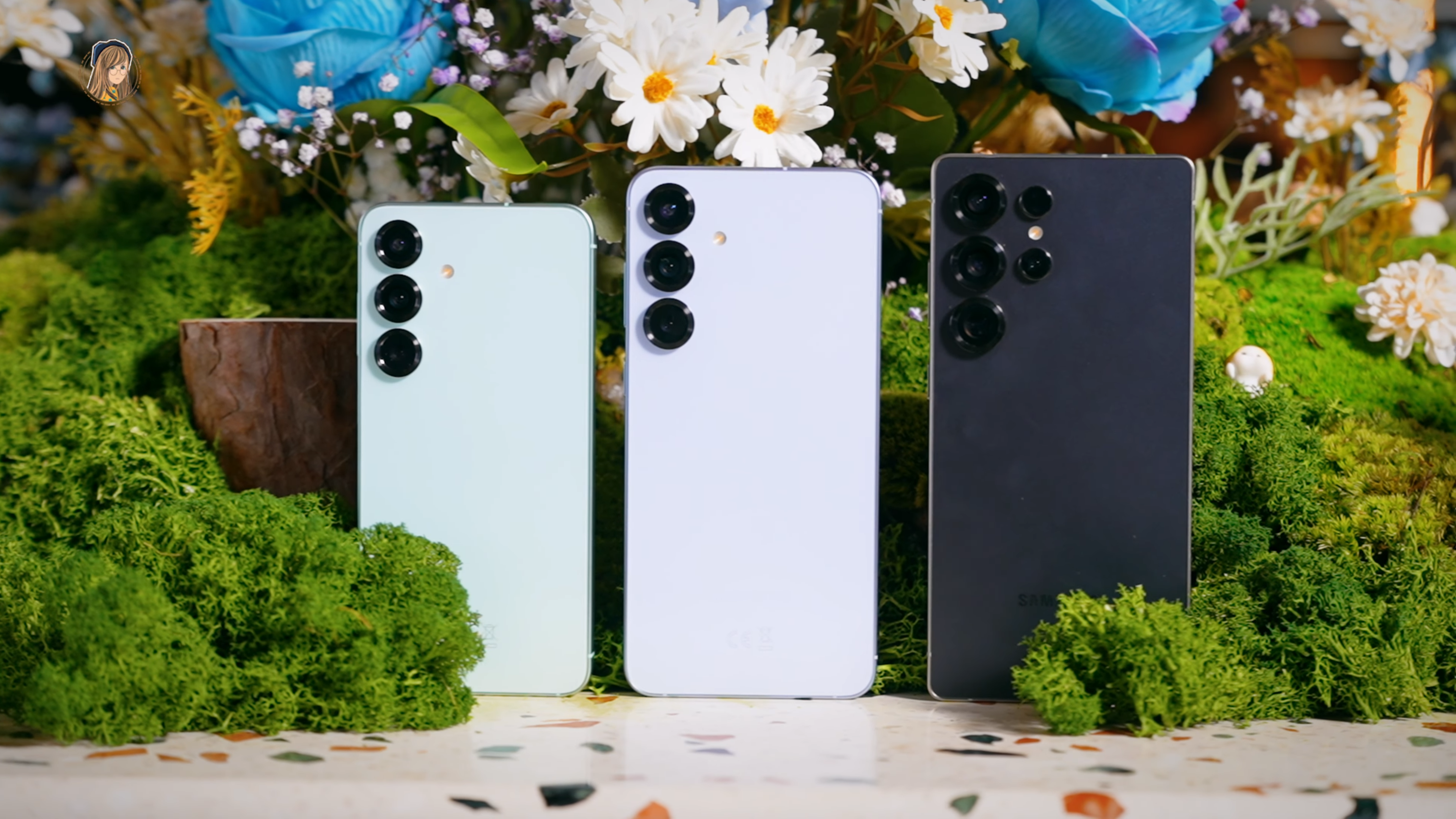
- Samsung Galaxy S25 series
- Brand: Samsung
- Manufacturer: Samsung Electronics
- Type: Smartphone
- Series: Galaxy S
- Family: Samsung Galaxy
- First released: S25, S25+ and S25 Ultra: February 7, 2025; 21 months ago S25 Edge: May 30, 2025; 17 months ago S25 FE: September 19, 2025; 13 months ago
- Availability by region: S25, S25+ and S25 Ultra: February 7, 2025; 21 months ago S25 Edge: May 30, 2025; 17 months ago S25 FE: September 19, 2025; 13 months ago
- Discontinued: S25, S25+, S25 Ultra and S25 Edge: February 25, 2026; 8 months ago S25 FE: August 27, 2026; 2 months ago
- Predecessor: Samsung Galaxy S24
- Successor: Samsung Galaxy S26
- Related: Samsung Galaxy Z Fold 7 Samsung Galaxy Z Flip 7 Samsung Galaxy Z Flip 7 FE; Samsung Galaxy Z TriFold
- Compatible networks: 2G / 3G / 4G / 5G
- Form factor: Slate
- Colors: S25 and S25+: Icyblue, Mint, Navy, Silver Shadow, Pinkgold, Coralred, Blueblack; S25 Ultra: Titanium Silverblue, Titanium Black, Titanium Whitesilver, Titanium Gray, Titanium Jadegreen, Titanium Jetblack, Titanium Pinkgold; S25 Edge: Titanium Icyblue, Titanium Silver, Titanium Jetblack; S25 FE: Icyblue, Jetblack, Navy, White, Blue
- Dimensions: S25: H: 146.9 mm (5.78 in), W: 70.5 mm (2.78 in), D: 7.2 mm (0.28 in); S25+: H: 158.4 mm (6.24 in), W: 75.8 mm (2.98 in), D: 7.3 mm (0.29 in); S25 Ultra: H: 162.8 mm (6.41 in), W: 77.6 mm (3.06 in), D: 8.2 mm (0.32 in); S25 Edge: H: 158.2 mm (6.23 in), W: 75.6 mm (2.98 in), D: 5.8 mm (0.23 in); S25 FE: H: 161.3 mm (6.35 in), W: 76.6 mm (3.02 in), D: 7.4 mm (0.29 in)
- Weight: S25: 162 g (5.7 oz); S25+: 190 g (6.7 oz); S25 Edge: 163 g (5.7 oz); S25 Ultra: 218 g (7.7 oz); S25 FE: 190 g (6.7 oz)
- Operating system: Original: All except S25 FE: Android 15 with One UI 7 S25 FE: Android 16 with One UI 8.0; Current: Android 17 with One UI 9
- System-on-chip: All except S25 FE: Qualcomm Snapdragon 8 Elite For Galaxy (3 nm); S25 FE: Samsung Exynos 2400
- CPU: 2x 4.47 GHz Oryon (Phoenix L) and 6x 3.53 GHz Oryon (Phoenix M)
- GPU: Adreno 830
- Modem: Qualcomm Snapdragon X80 5G
- Memory: 12 GB across lineup 16 GB for only S25 Ultra 1 TB (Asia exclusive)
- Storage: S25 & S25 FE: 128/256/512 GB; S25+ & S25 Edge: 256/512 GB; S25 Ultra: 256/512 GB, 1 TB; UFS 4.0
- SIM: 1× or 2× nano-SIM and 2× eSIM
- Battery: S25: Li-ion 4000 mAh; S25+ & S25 FE: Li-ion 4900 mAh; S25 Ultra: Li-ion 5000 mAh; S25 Edge: Li-ion 3900 mAh
- Charging: S25 & S25 Edge: Super fast charging at 25W; S25+ & S25 Ultra & S25 FE: Super fast charging 2.0 at 45W; All: Qi2 wireless charging at up to 15W; Reverse charging at 4.5W (wired and wireless)
- Rear camera: S25 and S25+: 50 MP, f/1.8, 24mm (wide), 1/1.56", 1.0μm, Dual Pixel PDAF, OIS; 10 MP, f/2.4, 67mm (telephoto), 1/3.94", 1.0μm, PDAF, OIS, 3× optical zoom 12 MP, f/2.2, 13mm, 120˚ (ultrawide), 1/2.55", 1.4μm, Super Steady video S25 Ultra: 200 MP, f/1.7, 24mm (wide), 1/1.3", 0.6μm, multi-directional PDAF, OIS; 50 MP, f/3.4, 111mm (periscope telephoto), 1/2.52", 0.7μm, dual pixel PDAF, OIS, 5× optical zoom 10 MP, f/2.4, 67mm (telephoto), 1/3.52", 1.12μm, PDAF, OIS, 3× optical zoom 50 MP, f/1.9, 120˚ (ultrawide), 0.7μm, dual pixel PDAF, Super Steady Video; S25 Edge: 200 MP, f/1.7, 24mm (wide), 1/1.3", 0.6μm, multi-directional PDAF, OIS; 12 MP, f/2.2, 13mm, 120˚ (ultrawide), 1/2.55", 1.4μm, Super Steady video S25 FE: 50 MP, f/1.8, 24mm (wide), 1/1.57", 1.0μm, dual pixel PDAF, OIS; 8 MP, f/2.4, 75mm (telephoto), 1/4.4", 1.0μm, PDAF, OIS, 3× optical zoom 12 MP, f/2.2, 13mm, 123˚ (ultrawide), 1/3.0", 1.12μm
- Front camera: 12 MP, f/2.2, 26mm (wide), 1.12μm, dual pixel PDAF; HDR, HDR10+ 4K@30/60fps, 1080p@30fps
- Display: Dynamic LTPO AMOLED 2X, 120 Hz, HDR10+ peak brightness 2600 nits S25: 6.2 in (160 mm) 2340 × 1080 (416 ppi), 19.5:9 aspect ratio, 120 Hz refresh rate LTPO; S25+ & S25 Edge: 6.7 in (170 mm) 3120 × 1440 (513 ppi), 19.5:9 aspect ratio, 120 Hz LTPO; S25 Ultra: 6.9 in (180 mm) 3120 × 1440 (498 ppi), 19.5:9 aspect ratio, 120 Hz LTPO; S25 FE: 6.7 in (170 mm) 2340 × 1080 (385 ppi), 19.5:9 aspect ratio, 120 Hz refresh rate LTPO
- Sound: Stereo speakers, Dolby Atmos
- Connectivity: Wi-Fi 7 802.11 a/b/g/n/ac/ax/be tri-band, Bluetooth 5.4 A2DP LE; S25+/S25 Edge/S25 Ultra: UWB
- Data inputs: S Pen stylus (S25 Ultra); Accelerometer; Barometer; Fingerprint scanner (under display, ultrasonic); Gyroscope; Geomagnetic sensor Hall sensor Light sensor Proximity sensor
- Water resistance: IP68, up to 1.5 m (4.9 ft) for 30 minutes
- Development status: Announced on January 22, 2025; Released on February 7, 2025 (S25, S25+ and S25 Ultra)
- Hearing aid compatibility: M2/T2, M3/T3, M4/T4
- Made in: Vietnam; India; Egypt; South Korea
- Website: Galaxy S25 & S25+ Galaxy S25 Ultra; Galaxy S25 Edge; Galaxy S25 FE

The Samsung Galaxy S25 is a series of high-end Android-based smartphones manufactured, developed, designed and marketed by Samsung Electronics as part of its flagship Galaxy S series. They collectively serve as the successor to the Galaxy S24 series. The first three models were announced on January 22, 2025, at the Samsung's Galaxy Unpacked event in San Jose, California, and were released on February 7, 2025.

Two additional models were also launched in the series: the Galaxy S25 Edge, was revealed at the end of the first event, then launched at Galaxy Unpacked on May 13, 2025, and later released on May 30; and Galaxy S25 FE was launched on September 4, 2025 and was released to the market two weeks later on September 19, 2025.

On February 25, 2026, Samsung announced the successor to the Galaxy S25 series, the Samsung Galaxy S26 series.

== History ==
=== Galaxy S25 ===
The Galaxy S25's existence was first revealed in a video showing a Galaxy S25 Ultra, with rounded edges with a revamp of the One UI experience ahead of its unveiling, with colors for the phones also leaked. The Unpacked event teaser was leaked in December 2024, with the Galaxy S25's design also shown. A promotional trailer for the phones was leaked online in January 2025.

The Galaxy S25, S25+ and S25 Ultra were officially announced at the Samsung's Galaxy Unpacked event in San Jose, California, on January 22, 2025. They were the first phones to lack the Galaxy Note design, in favor of a flat design on all Galaxy S25 models. Pre-orders began on that same day and were made available on February 7, 2025.

=== Galaxy S25 Edge ===
The Galaxy S25 Edge was first teased at Samsung's Galaxy Unpacked event in San Jose, California, on January 22, 2025 to launch later in 2025. Ahead of its official unveiling, reports later suggest that the Galaxy S25 Edge would be using a Qualcomm Snapdragon 8 Elite processor, which would help in offering long-lasting battery life on its ultra-slim phone.

The Galaxy S25 Edge was announced via a press release on May 13, 2025, which features a 6.7-inch (17 cm) display, and measures 1.5mm thinner than the Galaxy S25+, and almost 2.5mm thinner than the Galaxy S25 Ultra. Pre-orders began on that same day and were made available on May 30, 2025.

== Lineup ==
The Galaxy S25 lineup includes five models: Galaxy S25, Galaxy S25+, Galaxy S25 Ultra, Galaxy S25 Edge and the Galaxy S25 FE. The S25 Edge, which is the thinnest Samsung phone since the Galaxy A8 (2015) and U100 (2007), is the first Edge model since the S7 Edge and the first Galaxy S phone since the S10e to only have two rear cameras.

In addition to manufacturing the Galaxy S25 Ultra in Vietnam and India, it was also officially manufactured in Egypt and launched in the local market through official stores and agents. It was exported to the Gulf and North African countries as a first step towards exporting this product.

=== Dimensions ===
The Galaxy S25 features a flat 6.2 in (160 mm) display. The Galaxy S25+ offers similar internal hardware with a larger 6.7 in (170 mm) display. The Galaxy S25 Ultra includes a 6.9 in (180 mm) display, a larger frame compared to its predecessor, and rounded corners that align more closely with the design language of the Galaxy S series.

The Galaxy S25 Edge, a new addition to the series, also has a 6.7-inch (17 cm) display and is the thinnest and most compact model in the lineup, at 5.8 mm (0.23 in) thick. Across the line-up, weights range from 162 g (Galaxy S25) to 218 g (Galaxy S25 Ultra).

While the S25 and S25+ have dimensions similar to their S24 counterparts, the S25 Ultra includes design adjustments, and the S25 Edge is distinguished by a thinner chassis.

Galaxy S25 series dimensions
| Model | Thickness | Weight |
|---|---|---|
| Galaxy S25 | 7.2 mm | 162 g |
| Galaxy S25+ | 7.3 mm | 190 g |
| Galaxy S25 Ultra | 8.2 mm | 218 g |
| Galaxy S25 Edge | 5.8 mm | 163 g |
| Galaxy S25 FE | 7.4 mm | 190 g |

=== Performance ===
The Galaxy S25 series (except the FE model) is powered by the Snapdragon 8 Elite chipset. Unlike previous Galaxy S generations that used different chipsets by region, the Snapdragon 8 Elite is used uniformly across all global variants. Manufactured using a 3 nm process, the chipset features an octa-core CPU with two high-performance Oryon cores clocked up to 4.47 GHz and six efficiency cores running at 3.53 GHz. Its Adreno 830 GPU provides hardware-accelerated graphics and AI-related processing, enabling performance in resource-intensive applications.

All models in the lineup feature a redesigned vapor chamber cooling system that helps dissipate heat produced by the chipset during heavy workloads. While select models share the same processor, the vapor chamber size and design differ by device. The S25 and S25+ use chambers approximately 15% larger than those of the Galaxy S24 series, the S25 FE has a 10% larger vapor chamber for cooling, the S25 Edge adopts a vapor chamber with a thinner and wider surface area, and the S25 Ultra integrates a chamber about 40% larger with additional material layers for heat dissipation.

=== Connectivity ===
The Galaxy S25, S25+, S25 Ultra, and S25 Edge all offer the same eSIM functionality in their respective regions. International variants support dual Nano-SIM slots along with dual eSIM profiles. U.S. models include a single Nano-SIM slot with dual eSIM support, while Chinese versions retain the traditional dual Nano-SIM configuration without eSIM capability.

== Design ==
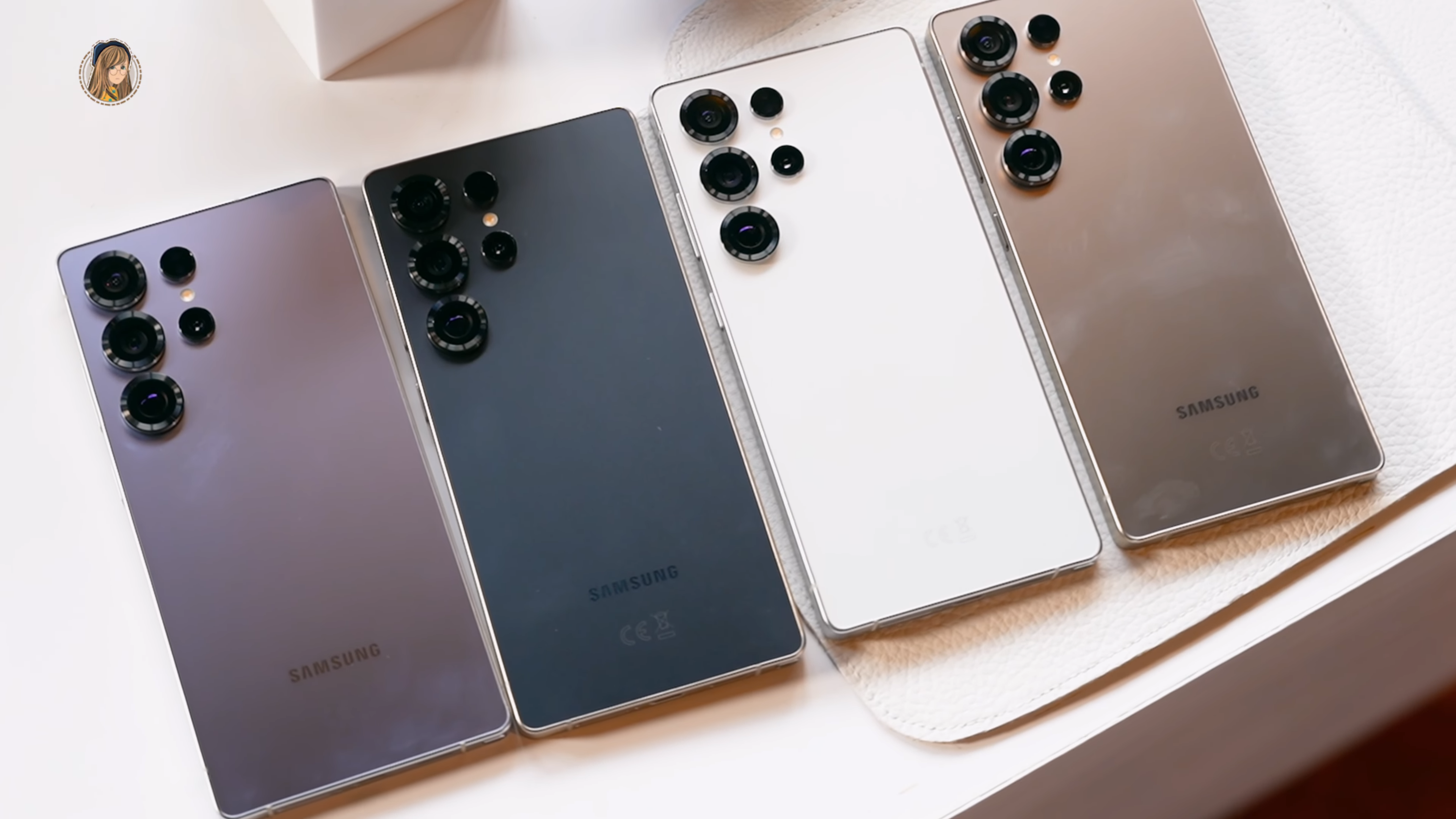
The colors of the S25 Ultra: Titanium Silverblue, Black, Whitesilver, and Gray

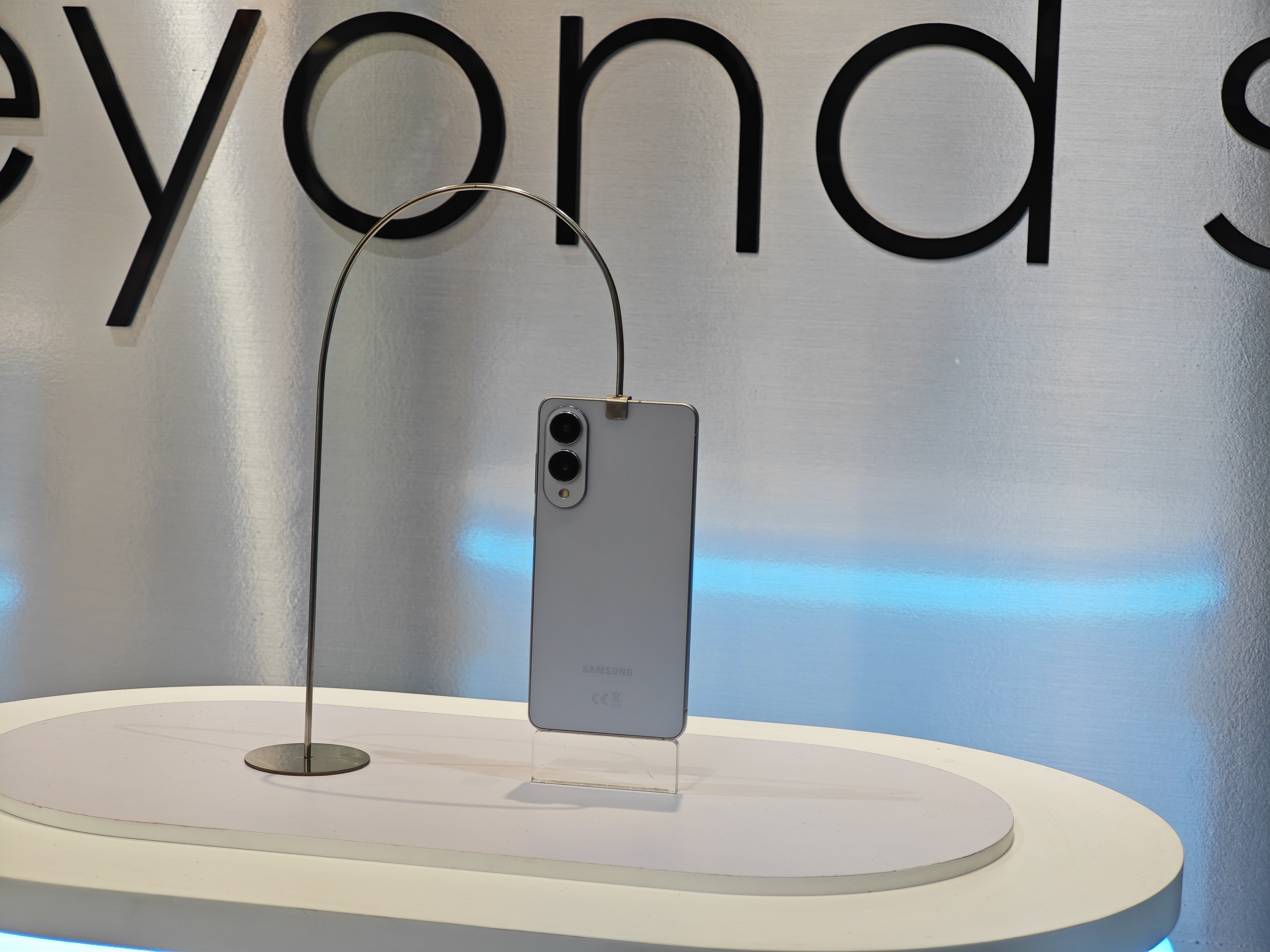
Galaxy S25 Edge

The S25 and S25+ smartphones have an aluminum body and a glass back, similar to the design of their predecessors. Both the S25 and S25+ use Gorilla Glass Victus 2 for both the front display and rear glass panel.

They come in five standard colors: Icy Blue, Mint, Navy, Silver Shadow, and Blue Black, having previously been available exclusively on Samsung's website alongside Pink Gold and Coral Red, which were removed from the exclusive list due to higher demand than anticipated.

The S25 Ultra has a titanium body and a glass back, similar to the S24 Ultra; however, the phone features rounded corners, unlike the S24 Ultra's squared corners. Additionally, the S25 Ultra uses Gorilla Glass Armor 2 for its front display and rear panel, improving durability and reducing glare.

The S25 Ultra comes in four standard colors: Titanium Silver Blue, Titanium Black, Titanium White Silver, and Titanium Grey, with Titanium Jet Black, initially an exclusive option, added to the roster later due to high demand. The S25 Ultra comes in two additional colors that are only available through Samsung's online website: Titanium Jade Green and Titanium Pink Gold.

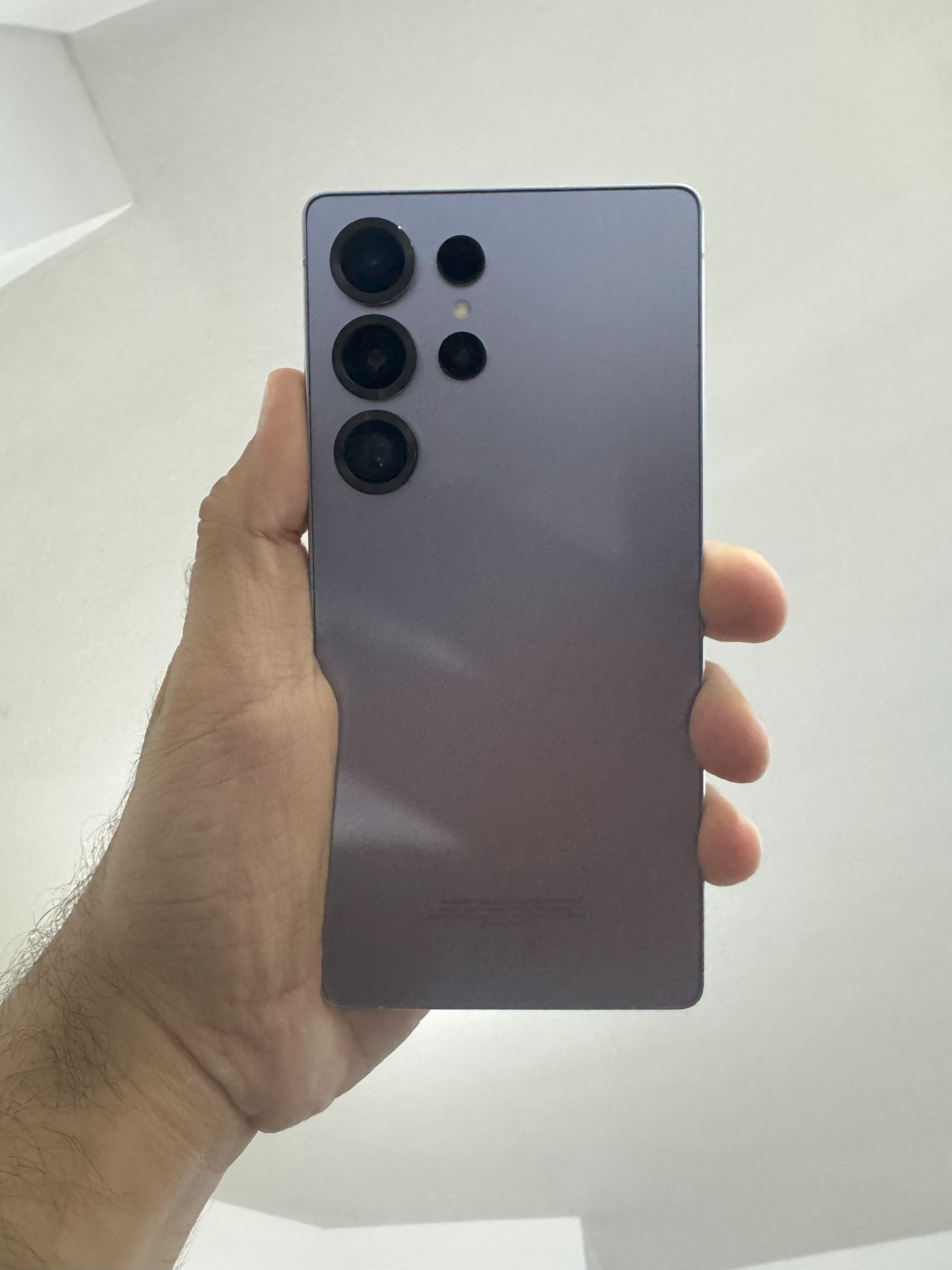
S25 Ultra in hand

The S25 Edge is available in three colors: Titanium Icy Blue, Titanium Silver, and Titanium Jet Black.

Galaxy S25 series color options
| Model | Galaxy S25 and S25+ | Galaxy S25 Ultra | Galaxy S25 Edge | Galaxy S25 FE |
|---|---|---|---|---|
| Base colors | Icy Blue; Mint; Navy; Silver Shadow; Blue black | Titanium Black; Titanium Grey; Titanium Whitesilver; Titanium Silverblue; Titanium Jetblack | Titanium Icyblue; Titanium Silver; Titanium Jetblack | White; Navy; Light Blue; Titanium Jetblack |
| Online exclusive colors | Pink gold; Coral red | Titanium Jadegreen; Titanium Pinkgold | —N/a | —N/a |

== Specifications ==
=== Display ===
The Galaxy S25 series features a Dynamic LTPO AMOLED 2X display across all models with HDR10+ support and a 120 Hz refresh rate, reaching up to 2600 nits. Each device also includes an ultrasonic in-screen fingerprint sensor, except for the S25 FE, which uses an optical in-screen fingerprint sensor. The S25 Ultra uses Corning Gorilla Armor 2, the S25 Edge uses Corning Gorilla Glass Ceramic 2 on the front, and the S25 and S25+ use Gorilla Glass Victus 2.

According to Corning, the Gorilla Armor 2 on the S25 Ultra offers enhanced durability, with over four times greater scratch resistance than conventional lithium-aluminosilicate cover glass and features anti-reflective properties to reduce surface glare. Laboratory tests further reported that it can withstand drops of up to 2.2 metres onto a surface simulating concrete, while comparable glass-ceramic materials reportedly failed from 1 metre.

==== ProScaler ====
ProScaler is an AI-based upscaling technology embedded in the Galaxy S25+, S25 Edge, and S25 Ultra models. Leveraging Samsung's ProVisual Engine, ProScaler is designed to enhance lower-resolution content by upscaling it to higher resolutions, improving how it appears on high-resolution displays. The ProScaler feature is optimized for QHD+ resolution (3120×1440 pixels), which provides a higher pixel density than FHD+. QHD+ allows ProScaler's AI-based upscaling to produce consistent visuals.

| Spec | Galaxy S25 | Galaxy S25+ | Galaxy S25 Edge | Galaxy S25 Ultra | Galaxy S25 FE |
|---|---|---|---|---|---|
| Display size | 6.2 in (157 mm) | 6.7 in (170 mm) | 6.7 in (170 mm) | 6.9 in (175 mm) | 6.7 in (170 mm) |
| Resolution | 2340×1080 | 3120×1440 | | | 2340×1080 |
| ProScaler | No | Yes | | | No |
| Density | ~416 ppi | ~513 ppi | | ~498 ppi | ~385 ppi |
| Aspect ratio | 19.5:9 | | | | |
| Refresh rate | 1 Hz to 120 Hz | | | | |
| Panel | Dynamic LTPO AMOLED 2X, HDR10+ | | | | |
| Cover glass | Gorilla Glass Victus 2 | | Gorilla Glass Ceramic 2 | Gorilla Glass Armor 2 | Gorilla Glass Victus Plus |

=== Camera ===
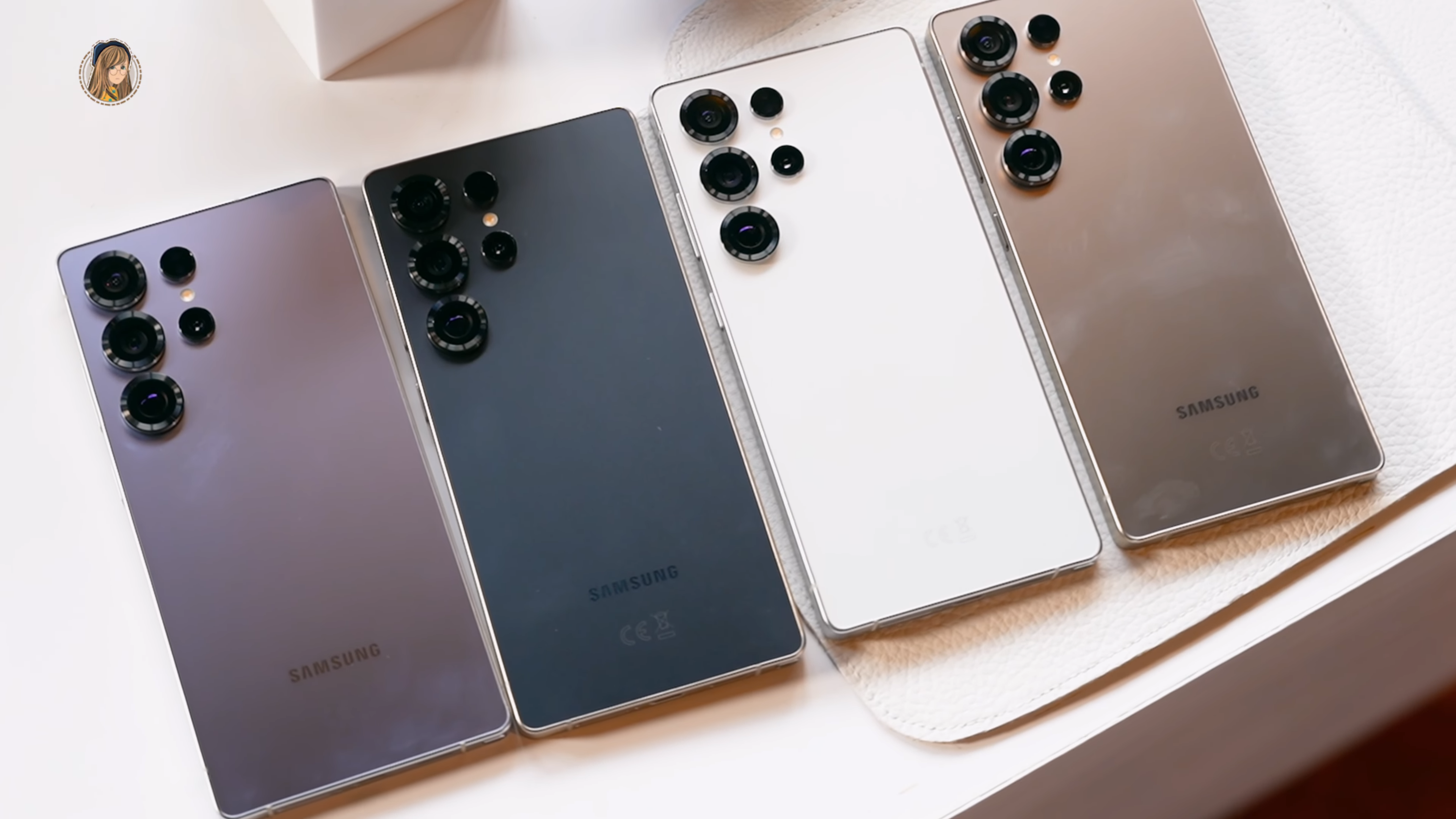
Close-up of the S25 Ultra camera system compared to its predecessor

The Galaxy S25 and S25+ each feature a triple rear camera system consisting of a 50 MP wide-angle (main) camera, a 12 MP ultra-wide camera with a 120° field of view, and a 10 MP telephoto camera offering 3× optical zoom.

The Galaxy S25 Ultra features a quad camera setup, including a 200 MP wide-angle camera, a 50 MP ultra-wide camera, a 10 MP telephoto camera with 3× optical zoom, and a 50 MP periscope telephoto camera with 5× optical zoom.

The Galaxy S25 Edge features a dual-camera system with a 200 MP wide-angle sensor and a 12 MP ultrawide sensor, but no telephoto lens. The Galaxy S25 FE, meanwhile, features a triple rear camera system consisting of a 50 MP wide-angle (main) camera, a 12 MP ultra-wide camera with a 120° field of view, and a 8 MP telephoto camera offering 3× optical zoom.

All models in the series feature a 12 MP front-facing camera (f/2.2) for selfies and video calls.

Under the ProVisual Engine—a Samsung Galaxy AI imaging system—the Ultra model includes image processing features such as adaptive scene optimization and noise reduction for photography and videography. The S25 Ultra further introduces a Quad Tele System, allowing four distinct optical zoom levels (2×, 3×, 5×, and 10×), which provides flexibility in framing subjects at varying distances. All models support pixel-binning techniques and include a Super Steady video mode for stabilization.

All models in the series can record video at up to 8K resolution at 30 fps, delivering high-resolution video capture across the lineup.

| Camera Type | Galaxy S25 FE | Galaxy S25 | Galaxy S25+ | Galaxy S25 Edge | Galaxy S25 Ultra |
|---|---|---|---|---|---|
| Wide | 50 MP | | | 200 MP | |
| Ultra-wide | 12 MP (123 °FOV) | 12 MP (120 °FOV) | | 12 MP | 50 MP |
| Telephoto | 8 MP (3×) | 10 MP (3×) | | —N/a | 10 MP (3×) |
| Periscope telephoto | —N/a | | | | 50 MP (5×) |
| Front camera | 12 MP (f/2.2) | | | | |
| Additional features | Sensor-size & pixel-binning; Super Steady mode | | | | AI-powered zoom optimization; Sensor-size & pixel-binning; Super Steady mode |
All models support 8K video recording at up to 30 fps.

=== Batteries ===
The Galaxy S25 models have similar battery capacities to the S24 series. However, the S25 Edge has a smaller battery than the S25+ due to its decreased thickness. The S25 and S25 Edge support wired charging at up to 25 W, whereas the S25+, S25 Ultra and S25 FE support 45 W charging. The S25 Ultra can reach up to 65% charge in around 30 minutes with a 45 W adapter, while the S25 and S25 Edge reach about 50% in the same time with a 25 W adapter. All five support Qi2 inductive charging up to 15 W, and can charge other Qi-compatible devices wirelessly using battery power.

| | Galaxy S25 Edge | Galaxy S25 | Galaxy S25+ | Galaxy S25 Ultra | Galaxy S25 FE |
|---|---|---|---|---|---|
| Battery capacity | 3,900 mAh | 4,000 mAh | 4,900 mAh | 5,000 mAh | 4,900 mAh |
| Wired charging speed | 25 W | | 45 W | | |
| Qi2 wireless charging speed | 15 W | | | | |
| Reverse charging speed | 4.5 W | | | | |
| Ref. | | | | | |

=== Memory and storage ===
Unlike previous generations, all Galaxy S25 models launched with 12 GB of RAM. The S25 starts at 128 GB of storage, while the other three models start at 256 GB. The S25 Edge also comes standard with 12 GB of RAM and does not offer configurable RAM options.

However, in the markets of South Korea, the People's Republic of China, Hong Kong, and the Republic of China (known as Taiwan), a 16 GB RAM option exists for certain Galaxy S25 Ultra models. For South Korean models, Titanium Jetblack phones with 1 TB of storage come with 16 GB of RAM. For the other three markets, regardless of color choice, the 1 TB storage option comes with 16 GB of RAM.

All models in the series use UFS 4.0 flash storage and LPDDR5X memory, which are supported by the Snapdragon 8 Elite platform. These technologies provide higher bandwidth and improved power efficiency compared with previous-generation mobile memory and storage standards.

| Model | Memory | Storage options | Storage type |
|---|---|---|---|
| Galaxy S25 | 12 GB | 128 GB / 256 GB / 512 GB | UFS 4.0 |
| Galaxy S25+ | 12 GB | 256 GB / 512 GB | UFS 4.0 |
| Galaxy S25 Ultra | 12 GB / 16 GB (region-dependent) | 256 GB / 512 GB / 1 TB | UFS 4.0 |
| Galaxy S25 Edge | 12 GB | 256 GB / 512 GB | UFS 4.0 |
| Galaxy S25 FE | 8 GB | 128 GB / 256 GB / 512 GB | UFS 4.0 |
| Ref. | | | |

=== Connectivity ===
All models in the Galaxy S25 series, except the S25 FE, support 5G connectivity, Wi-Fi 7, Bluetooth 5.4, NFC, and USB Type-C 3.2 for data transfer and charging. Ultra-Wideband (UWB) is supported only on the S25+, S25 Edge, and S25 Ultra models. The S25 FE only supports Wi-Fi 6E.

| Model | Wi-Fi | Bluetooth | UWB | USB | NFC |
|---|---|---|---|---|---|
| Galaxy S25 | Wi-Fi 7 | 5.4 | No | USB-C 3.2 (5Gbps) | Yes |
| Galaxy S25+ | Wi-Fi 7 | 5.4 | Yes | USB-C 3.2 (5Gbps) | Yes |
| Galaxy S25 Ultra | Wi-Fi 7 | 5.4 | Yes | USB-C 3.2 (5Gbps) | Yes |
| Galaxy S25 Edge | Wi-Fi 7 | 5.4 | Yes | USB-C 3.2 (5Gbps) | Yes |
| Galaxy S25 FE | Wi-Fi 6E | 5.4 | No | USB-C 3.2 (5Gbps) | Yes |
| Ref. | | | | | |

== Software ==
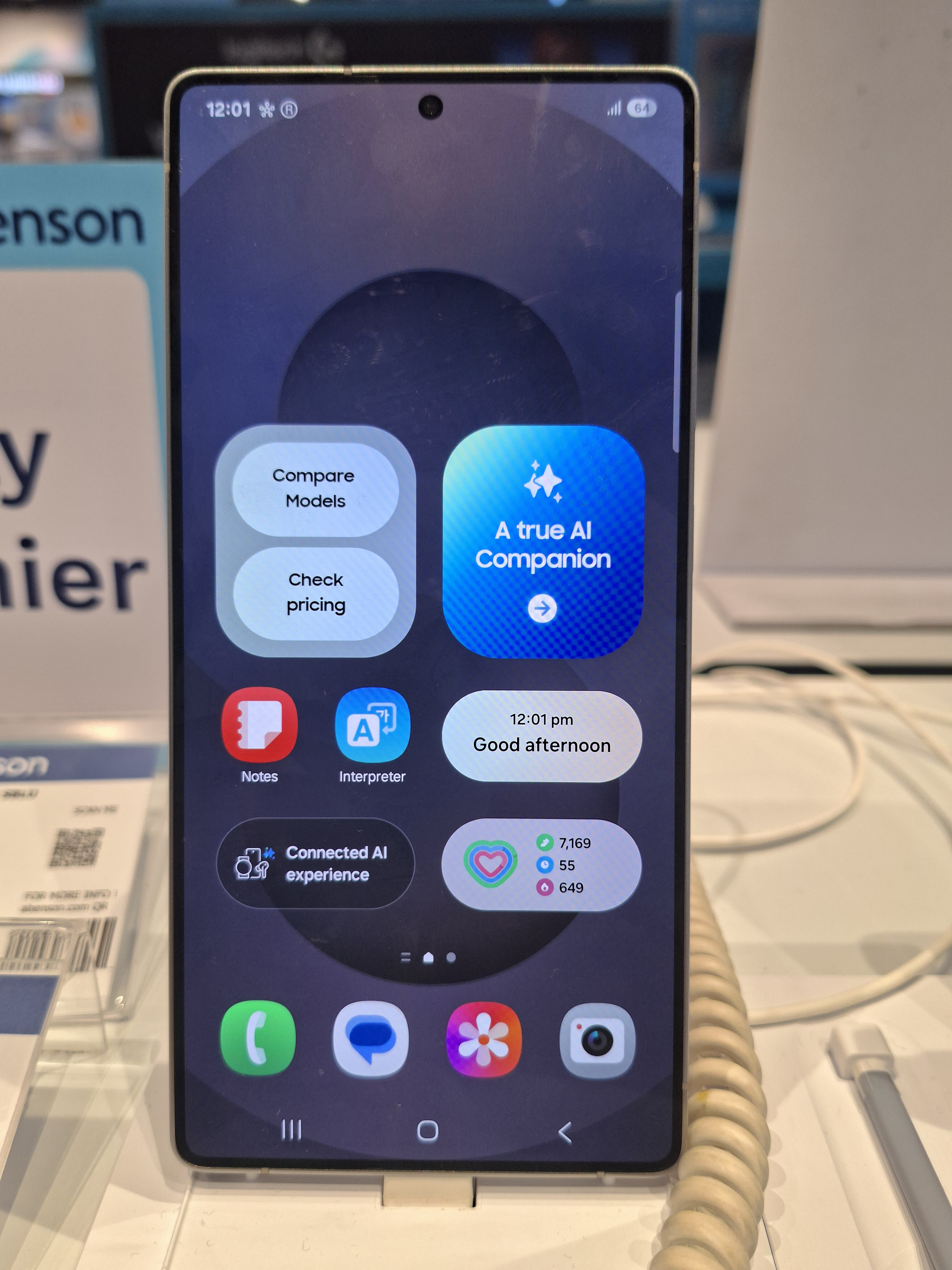
One UI 7 on a S25 Ultra

The Galaxy S25, S25+, S25 Ultra, and S25 Edge were the first to be released with Android 15 and One UI 7. In contrast, the S25 FE was released subsequently with Android 16 and One UI 8. Like its predecessor, Samsung has promised 7 years of OS and security updates (with support ending within 2032, despite having different pre-installed Android OS and One UI versions).

The devices are additionally shipped with Galaxy AI, Samsung's suite of artificial intelligence features. As a relatively new technology, it has received updated capabilities in the S25 series.

| | Pre-installed OS | OS Upgrades history | | | | | | | End of support |
| | Pre-installed OS | 1st | 2nd | 3rd | 4th | 5th | 6th | 7th | End of support |
|---|---|---|---|---|---|---|---|---|---|
| S25; S25+ S25 Ultra | Android 15 (One UI 7.0) | Android 16 (One UI 8.0); September 2025 (One UI 8.5); May 2026 | Android 17 (One UI 9.0); September 2026 | | | | | | Within 2032 |
| S25 Edge | Android 15 (One UI 7.0) | Android 16 (One UI 8.0); September 2025 (One UI 8.5); May 2026 | Android 17 (One UI 9.0); September 2026 | | | | | | Within 2032 |
| S25 FE | Android 16 (One UI 8.0) Minor One UI update: (One UI 8.5); May 2026 | Android 17 (One UI 9.0); September 2026 | | | | | | | Within 2032 |

== Reception ==
Whilst iterative, the S25 was reviewed as a well-balanced phone, and one of the best of 2025, with only its AI receiving (as a new technology) some caveats. It was also praised as being the most compact of Android's high-end phones and for its ease of repair and usage of recycled materials.

=== S Pen controversy ===
With the release of the S25 Ultra, Samsung opted to remove the Bluetooth functionality in its trademark S Pen, a feature added to the stylus with the Galaxy Note 9 in 2018. Samsung sought to remove the Bluetooth features between the phone and the pen as a cost-saving measure, claiming they were used by less than 1% of Galaxy users. Among the functions lost in are remote camera control, air actions, and several in-app features for programs such as PowerPoint or the native Gallery app.

== Issues ==
Many S25 Ultra users had experienced battery drain and overheating after installing the July 2026 security update. Users had traced the issue over to WhatsApp where the backup process would get stuck during the installation of the update.

== See also ==
- Samsung Galaxy
- List of longest smartphone telephoto lenses
- Comparison of Samsung Galaxy S smartphones

| Preceded by Samsung Galaxy S24 | Samsung Galaxy S25; 2025 | Succeeded by Samsung Galaxy S26 |
