= Samsung Galaxy Z Fold 5 =

2023 foldable smartphone by Samsung Electronics

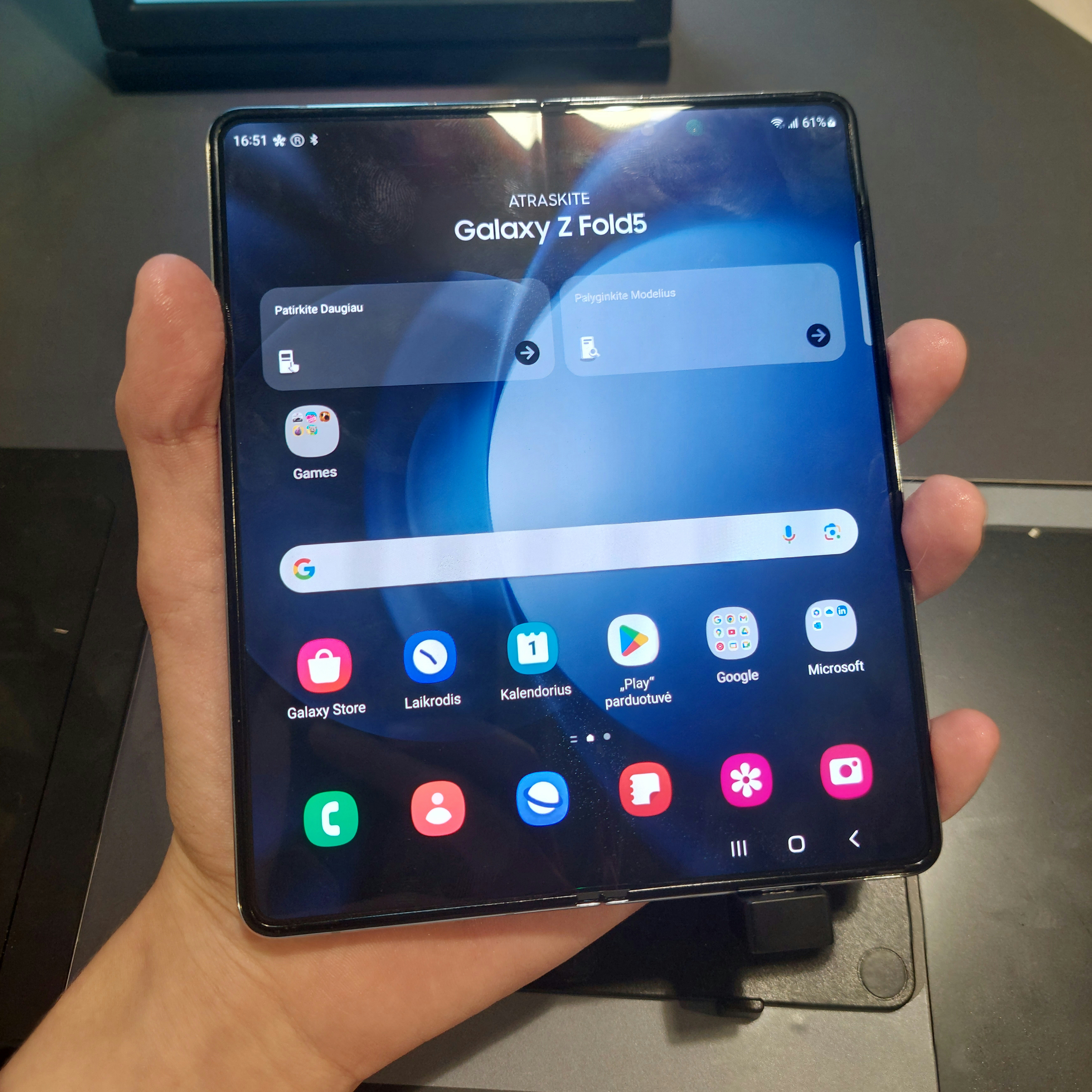
- Samsung Galaxy Z Fold 5 (unfolded)
- Also known as: Samsung Galaxy Fold 5 (in certain European countries)
- Brand: Samsung
- Manufacturer: Samsung Electronics
- Type: Foldable smartphone
- Series: Galaxy Z
- Family: Samsung Galaxy
- First released: August 11, 2023; 3 years ago
- Availability by region: August 11, 2023; 3 years ago
- Discontinued: July 10, 2024; 2 years ago
- Predecessor: Samsung Galaxy Z Fold 4
- Successor: Samsung Galaxy Z Fold 6
- Related: Samsung Galaxy S23; Samsung Galaxy Z Flip 5
- Compatible networks: 2G, 3G, 4G, 5G
- Form factor: Foldable slate
- Dimensions: Folded: 154.9 mm (6.10 in) H 67.1 mm (2.64 in) W 13.4 mm (0.53 in) D; Unfolded: 154.9 mm (6.10 in) H 130.1 mm (5.12 in) W 6.1 mm (0.24 in) D
- Weight: 253 g (8.9 oz)
- Operating system: Original: Android 13 with One UI 5.1.1; Current: Android 17 with One UI 9.0
- System-on-chip: Qualcomm Snapdragon 8 Gen 2 for Galaxy
- CPU: Octa-core (1x3.36 GHz Cortex-X3 & 2x2.8 GHz Cortex-A715 & 2x2.8 GHz Cortex-A710 & 3x2.0 GHz Cortex-A510)
- GPU: Adreno 740
- Memory: 12 GB RAM
- Storage: 256 GB, 512 GB and 1 TB
- Removable storage: None
- SIM: Nano-SIM and eSIM
- Battery: Li-Ion 4400 mAh
- Charging: USB PD: 25W (PPS), 15W (non-PPS); Fast wireless charging 15W; Reverse wireless charging 4.5W
- Rear camera: 50 MP, f/1.8, 23mm (wide), 1.0μm, Dual Pixel PDAF, OIS; 10 MP, f/2.4, 69mm (telephoto), PDAF, OIS, 3x optical zoom; 12 MP, f/2.2, 123°, 13mm (ultrawide), 1.12μm; LED flash, HDR, panorama; 8K@24fps, 4K@60fps, 1080p@60/240fps (gyro-EIS), 720p@960fps (gyro-EIS), HDR10+
- Front camera: 4 MP, f/1.8, 26mm (wide), 2.0μm, under display Cover camera: 10 MP, f/2.2, 24mm (wide), 1/3", 1.22μm 4K@30/60fps, 1080p@30/60fps, gyro-EIS
- Display: Dynamic AMOLED 2X; 2176 × 1812, 7.6 in (19.3 cm), ~6:5 aspect ratio, 373 ppi, HDR10+, 120 Hz refresh rate, 1750 nits (peak)
- External display: Dynamic AMOLED 2X; 2316 × 904, 6.2 in (15.7 cm), ~23.1:9 ratio, 401 ppi, 120 Hz refresh rate, Corning Gorilla Glass Victus 2, 1750 nits (peak)
- Sound: Stereo speakers
- Connectivity: Wi-Fi 802.11 a/b/g/n/ac/6e/7, tri-band, Wi-Fi Direct; Bluetooth 5.3, A2DP, LE, aptX HD
- Data inputs: Multi-touch screen; USB Type-C 3.2; Fingerprint scanner; Accelerometer; Gyroscope; Proximity sensor; Compass; Barometer
- Water resistance: IPX8 water resistant (up to 1.5m for 30 minutes)
- Model: International models: SM-F946x (last letter varies by carrier and international models); Japanese models: SCG22 (au) SC-55D (NTT Docomo)
- Website: Galaxy Z Fold 5

The Samsung Galaxy Z Fold 5 (stylized as Samsung Galaxy Z Fold5, sold as Samsung Galaxy Fold 5 in certain territories) is an Android-based foldable smartphone that was announced by Samsung Electronics on July 26, 2023, alongside the Galaxy Z Flip 5, Galaxy Tab S9 and Galaxy Watch 6. The unveiling marked the first time that the Galaxy Unpacked event was held in the company's home country of South Korea. The phone was released on August 11, 2023.

== Design ==
The Samsung Galaxy Z Fold 5 features a book-style foldable design and is constructed with an Armor Aluminum frame and Gorilla Glass Victus 2 on the cover screen and back panel. Compared to its predecessor Samsung Galaxy Z Fold 4, the device is thinner and lighter when folded, due to a redesigned hinge mechanism that minimizes the gap between screens.

Model	Galaxy Z Fold 5
Base colors	Phantom Black; Icy Blue; Cream
Online exclusive colors	Gray; Blue

== Specifications ==
=== Display ===
The Z Fold 5 features two Dynamic AMOLED 2X displays, just like its predecessor. Also carried over from its predecessor are its display size, screen resolution, and display type. It continues to have an under-display camera sensor for the main display.

Feature	Galaxy Z Fold 5
Main display size	7.6 inches (190 mm)
Cover display size	6.2 inches (160 mm)
Main display type	Dynamic AMOLED 2X Infinity Flex Display
Cover display type	Dynamic AMOLED 2X Infinity-O Display
Main resolution	2176 × 1812 (368 ppi)
Cover resolution	2316 × 904 (422 ppi)
Main aspect ratio	21.6:18
Cover aspect ratio	23.1:9
Refresh rate	Main display: 1–120 Hz (adaptive)
HDR	HDR10+
Main protection	Ultra Thin Glass
Cover protection	Gorilla Glass Victus 2
References	

=== Performance ===
The Galaxy Z Fold 5 uses the Qualcomm Snapdragon 8 Gen 2 for Galaxy, which was also used on the Galaxy S23 series. It is equipped with 12 GB of LPDDR5 RAM, and are available in 256 GB, 512 GB, or 1 TB (UFS 4.0) internal storage options.

=== Battery ===
The device has a 4,400 mAh dual-cell battery, also similar with its predecessors. It supports 25W wired fast charging, 15W wireless charging, and 4.5W reverse wireless charging.

=== Camera ===
The Galaxy Z Fold 5 features a triple rear camera system, along with front-facing cameras on both the cover and inner displays. Among its features is Dual Preview, which is supported on the native Camera app for devices running One UI 2.1 and later.

== Software ==
The Samsung Galaxy Z Fold 5 was released with Android 13 with Samsung's One UI 5.1.1 software. The software includes features designed for foldable use cases, such as Flex Mode support and cover screen interactions through the Flex Window interface.

Alongside the Galaxy Z Flip 5, Galaxy S23 and Galaxy Tab S9 series, it is the last Samsung flagship device to support 32-bit applications and is set to receive 4 OS upgrades and 5 years of security updates (support ending within 2028). It also marks the last time these devices will receive this level of support, as its successors all had 7 years of support.

	Pre-installed OS	OS Upgrades history				End of support
	Pre-installed OS	1st	2nd	3rd	4th	End of support
Z Fold 5	Android 13 (One UI 5.1)	Android 14 (One UI 6.0); November 2023 (One UI 6.1); April 2024 (One UI 6.1.1); September 2024	Android 15 (One UI 7.0); April 2025	Android 16 (One UI 8.0); September 2025 (One UI 8.5); May 2026	Android 17 (One UI 9.0); October 2026	Within 2028

== See also ==
- Samsung Galaxy Z series
- Samsung Galaxy Z Flip 5

Preceded by Samsung Galaxy Z Fold 4	Samsung Galaxy Z Fold 5; 2023	Succeeded by Samsung Galaxy Z Fold 6
