= Xiaomi 17 =

2025 Series of HyperOS-based smartphones

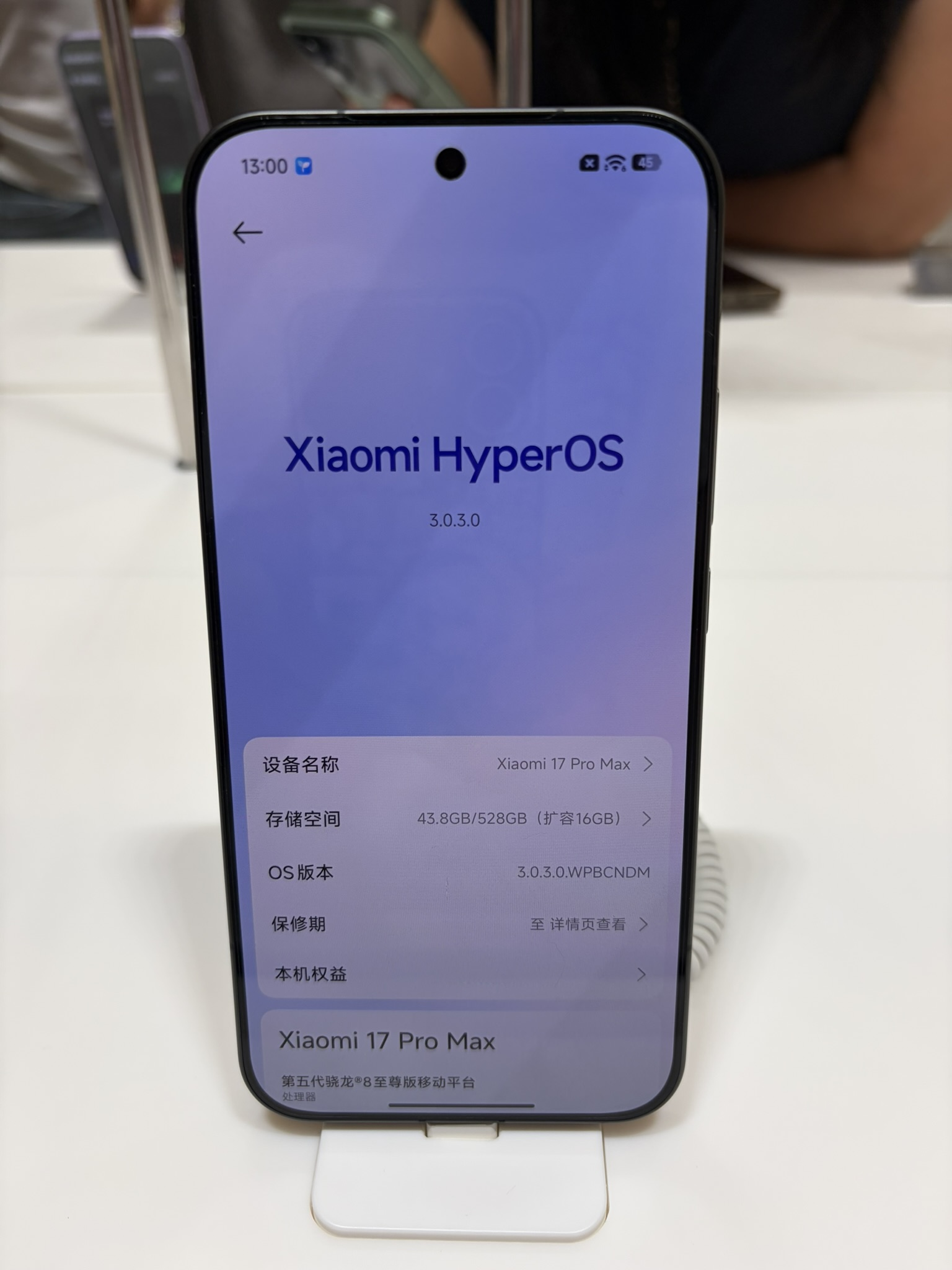
- Xiaomi 17 Pro Max
- Manufacturer: Xiaomi
- Type: 17/17 Pro: smartphone 17 Pro Max: phablet
- Series: Xiaomi
- First released: 17/Pro series: September 25, 2025; 13 months ago 17 Ultra: December 25, 2025; 10 months ago 17 Max: May 28, 2026; 5 months ago
- Availability by region: 17/Pro series: September 27, 2025; 13 months ago in China; 17 Ultra: December 27, 2025; 10 months ago in China; 17 Ultra: March 10, 2026; 7 months ago globally
- Predecessor: Xiaomi 15
- Related: Xiaomi 17T
- Form factor: Slate
- Dimensions: 17: 151.1 × 71.8 × 8.1 mm 17 Pro: 151.1 × 71.8 × 8 mm 17 Pro Max: 162.9 × 77.6 × 8 mm 17 Max: 162.9 × 77.6 × 8.15 mm (pixel black), 162.9 × 77.6 × 8.2 mm (clear blue sky and white)
- Weight: 17: 191 g 17 Pro: 192 g 17 Pro Max: 219 g 17 Max: 219 g (pixel black), 225 g (clear sky blue and white)
- Operating system: Original: Xiaomi HyperOS 3 (based on Android 16); Current: Xiaomi HyperOS 3 (based on Android 16)
- System-on-chip: Qualcomm SM8850-AC Snapdragon 8 Elite Gen 5 (3 nm)
- CPU: Octa-core (2x4.6 GHz Oryon V3 Phoenix L + 6x3.62 GHz Oryon V3 Phoenix M)
- GPU: Adreno 840
- Memory: 12 GB / 16 GB
- Storage: 256 GB / 512 GB / 1 TB; UFS 4.1
- Removable storage: N/A
- Battery: 17: 7000 mAh (China), 6330 mAh (Global); 17 Pro: 6300 mAh: 17 Pro Max: 7500 mAh; 17 Ultra: 6800 mAh (China), 6000 mAh (Global); 17 Max: 8000 mAh
- Charging: 100W wired, 50W wireless, 22.5W reverse wireless
- Rear camera: See the chapter for each model
- Front camera: 50 MP, f/2.2, 21mm (wide), PDAF
- Display: 17: 6.3-inch LTPO AMOLED, 120 Hz refresh rate, 3500 nits peak brightness 17 Pro: 6.3-inch LTPO AMOLED, 120 Hz refresh rate, 3500 nits peak brightness 17 Pro Max: 6.9-inch LTPO AMOLED, 120 Hz refresh rate, 3500 nits peak brightness
- Sound: Stereo speakers, Dolby Atmos
- Connectivity: 5G, Wi-Fi 7, Bluetooth 5.4, NFC, USB-C

The Xiaomi 17 series (Chinese: Xiaomi 17系列) is a line of Android-based smartphones manufactured by Xiaomi, succeeding the Xiaomi 15 series. Announced on 25 September 2025 during Lei Jun's 2025 Annual Speech, the series features a 7,000mAh silicon-carbon battery (6,330mAh on the global version), rear secondary displays on the Pro and Pro Max models, and a 50 MP Light Fusion 950 main sensor.

The lineup consists of the following models:

- Xiaomi 17 (standard)
- Xiaomi 17 Pro
- Xiaomi 17 Max
- Xiaomi 17 Pro Max
- Xiaomi 17 Ultra (with a different camera design)

== Specifications ==
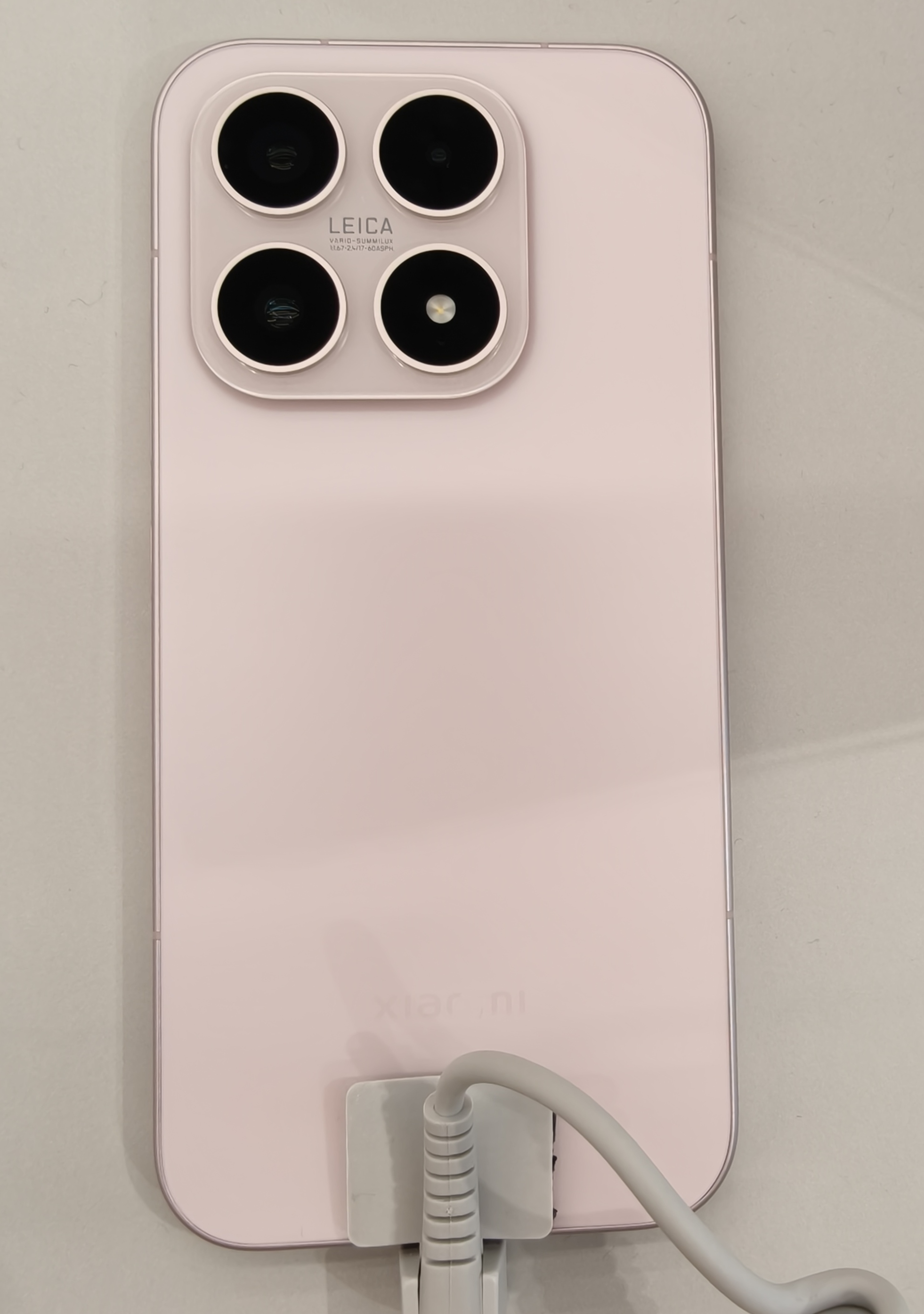
Xiaomi 17 in Alpine Pink

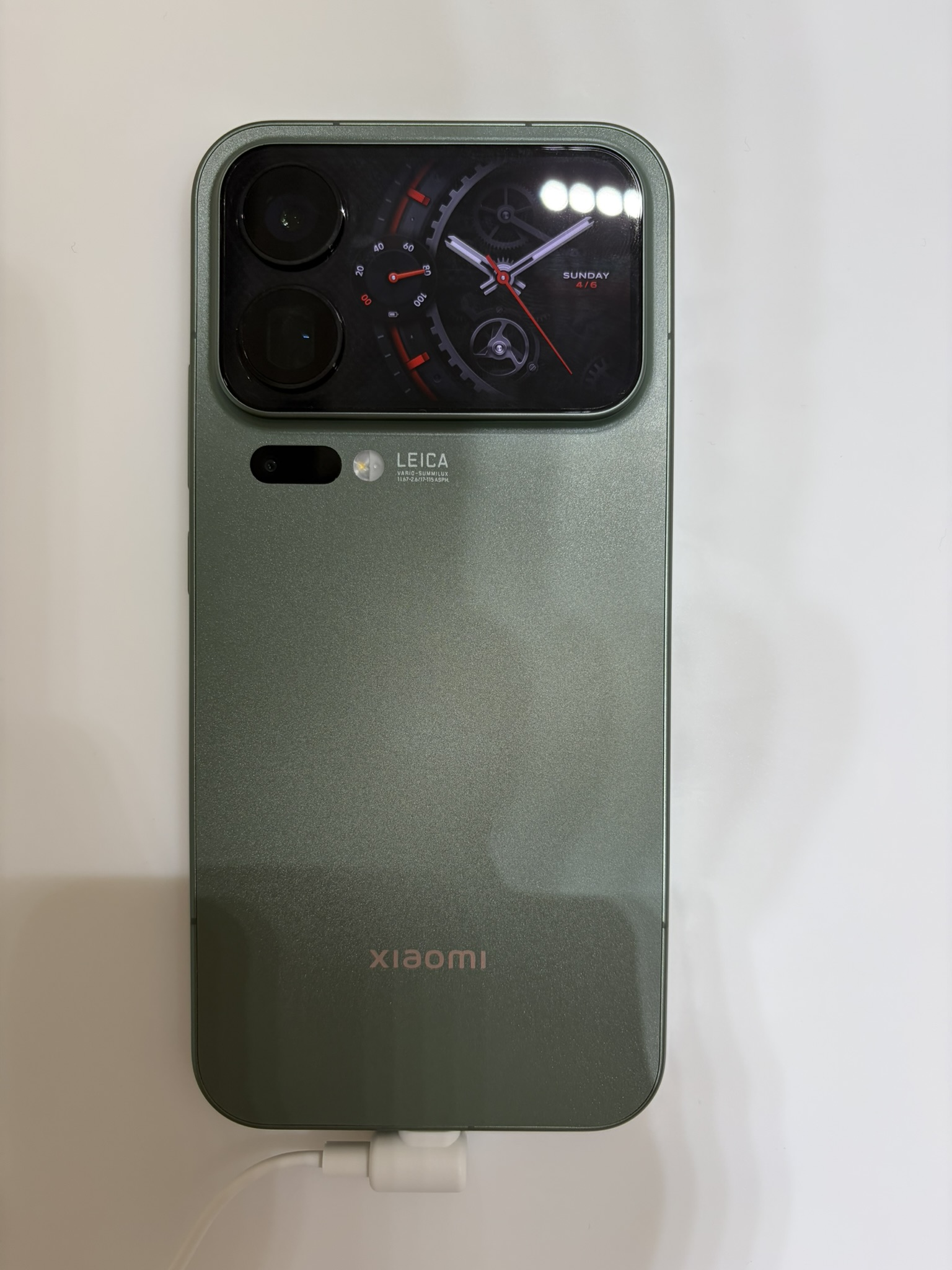
Rear of Xiaomi 17 Pro Max

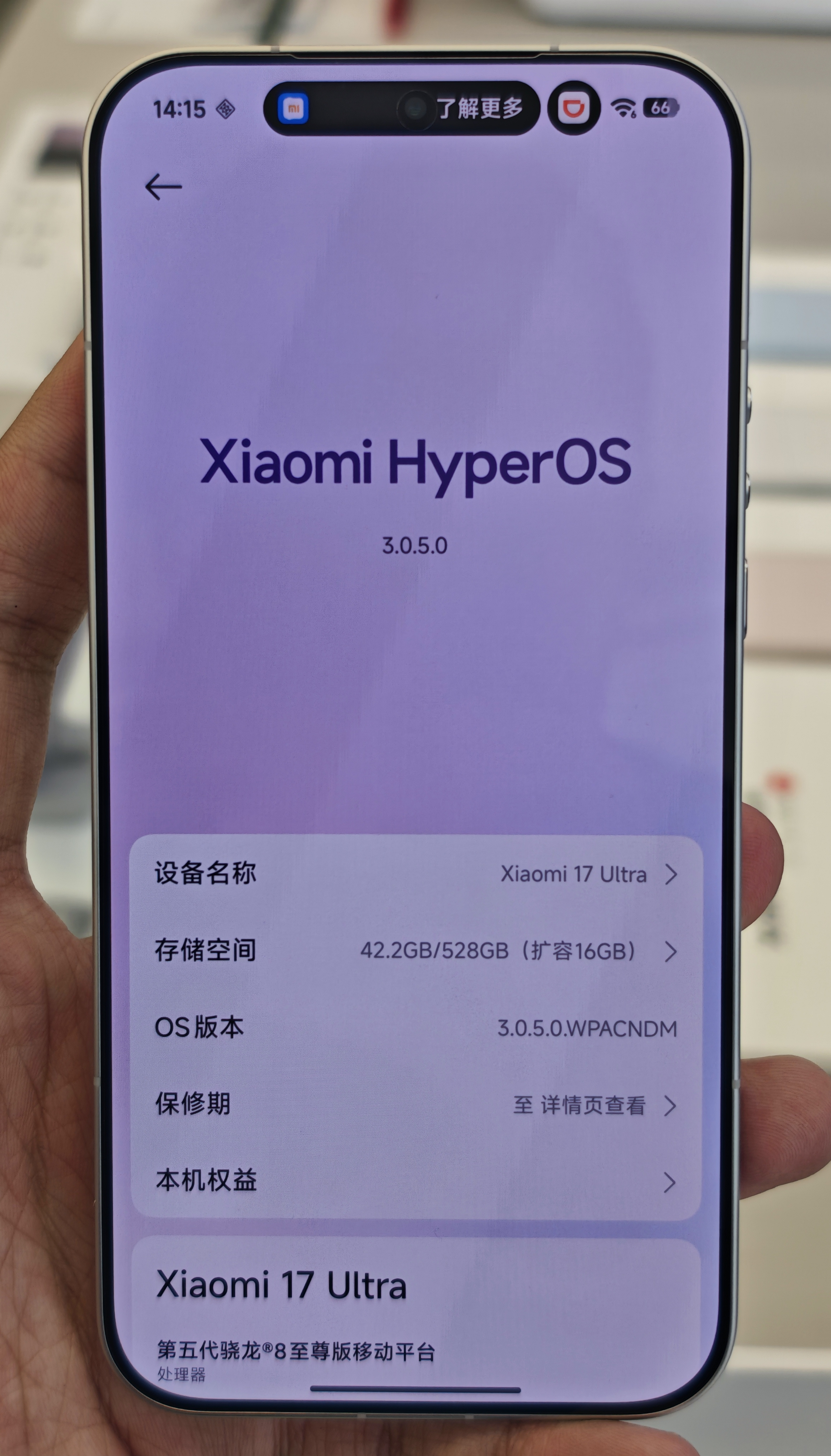
Xiaomi 17 Ultra

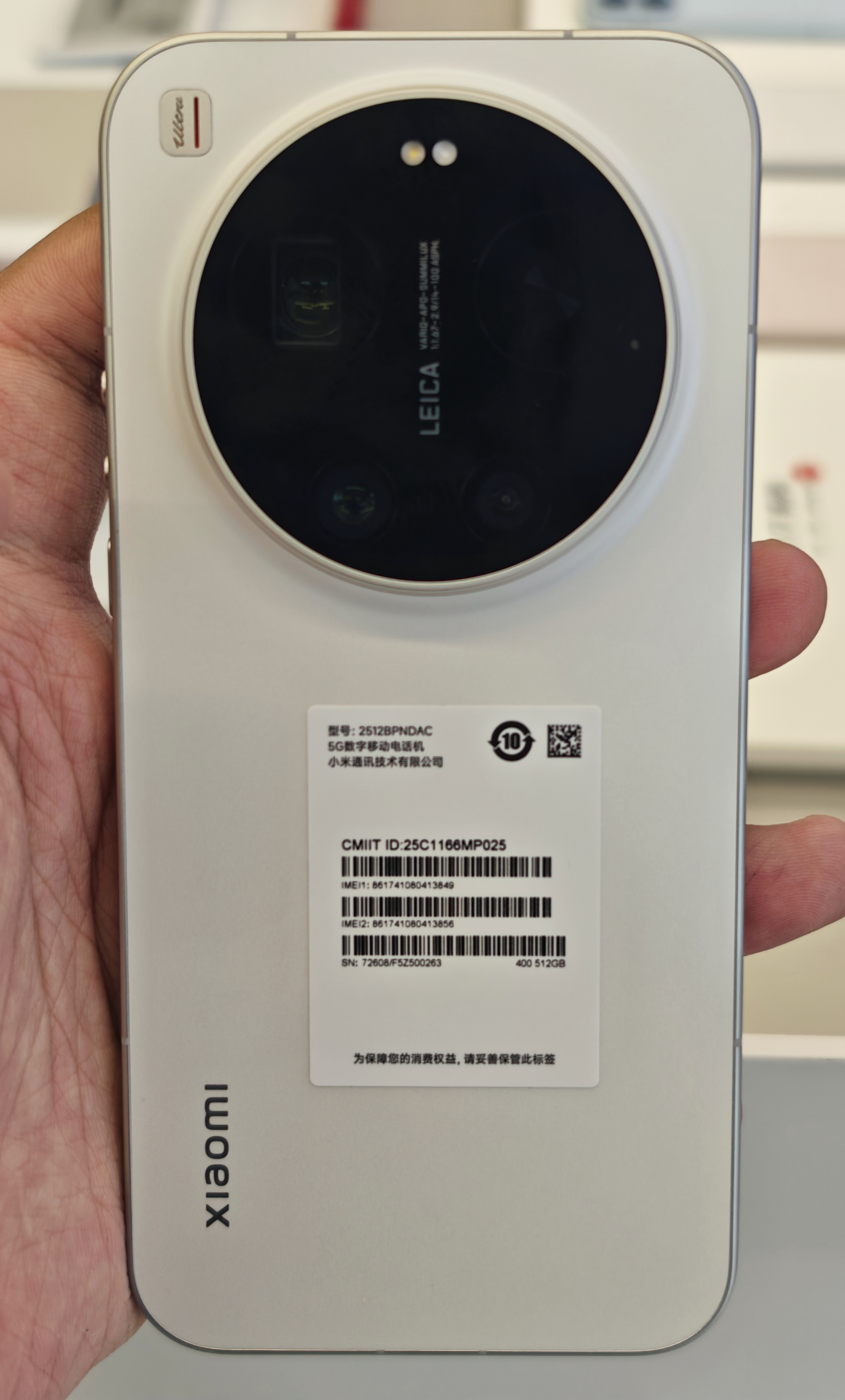
Rear of Xiaomi 17 Ultra

=== Hardware ===
The Xiaomi 17 series was the first to feature the Snapdragon 8 Elite Gen 5 chipset, built on TSMC's 3 nm fabrication process. The China-exclusive Pro and Pro Max models have also received a customizable 2.9-inch AMOLED display on the rear housing.

==== Camera system ====
===== Xiaomi 17 =====
UW: 50MP 17mm f2.4 OV50M (1/2.88")

W: 50MP 23mm f1.67 Light Fusion 950 (1/1.31") 13.5EV Dynamic range

T: 50MP 60mm f2.0 JN5 (1/2.76")

===== Xiaomi 17 Pro =====
UW: 50MP 17mm f2.4 OV50M (1/2.88") 5cm macro supported

W: 50MP 23mm f1.67 Light Fusion 950L (1/1.28") 16.5EV Dynamic range

T: 50MP 115mm f2.0 JN5 (1/2.76") 20cm macro supported

===== Xiaomi 17 Pro Max =====
UW: 50MP 17mm f2.4 OV50M (1/2.88") 5cm macro supported

W: 50MP 23mm f1.67 Light Fusion 950L (1/1.28") 16.5EV Dynamic range

T: 50MP 115mm f2.6 GN8 (1/2") 30cm macro supported

===== Xiaomi 17 Ultra =====
UW: 50MP 14mm f/2.2 JN2 (1/2.76")

W: 50MP 23mm f/1.7 Light Fusion 1050L (1-inch type)

T: 200MP 75-100mm f/2.4-3.0 HPE (1/1.4") continuous optical zoom, 26cm macro supported

==== Battery ====
In the Chinese market, the mainline Xiaomi 17 uses a 7,000mAh silicon-carbon (Si-C) battery with 100W wired and 50W wireless charging, while the global versions of the Xiaomi 17 use 6,330mAh batteries. The Xiaomi 17 Ultra's batteries are smaller, with the Chinese versions of the 17 Ultra using 6,800mAh batteries and the global versions using 6,000mAh batteries, but still maintaining wireless charging and the full 100W charging. Note that under Xiaomi's "smart charging" feature, 100W charging disables when the screen is on to manage heating.

=== Software ===
The Xiaomi 17 series launched with Xiaomi HyperOS 3 pre-installed. It is based on Android 16.

== Xiaomi 17 Ultra Leica Edition / Leica Leitzphone ==
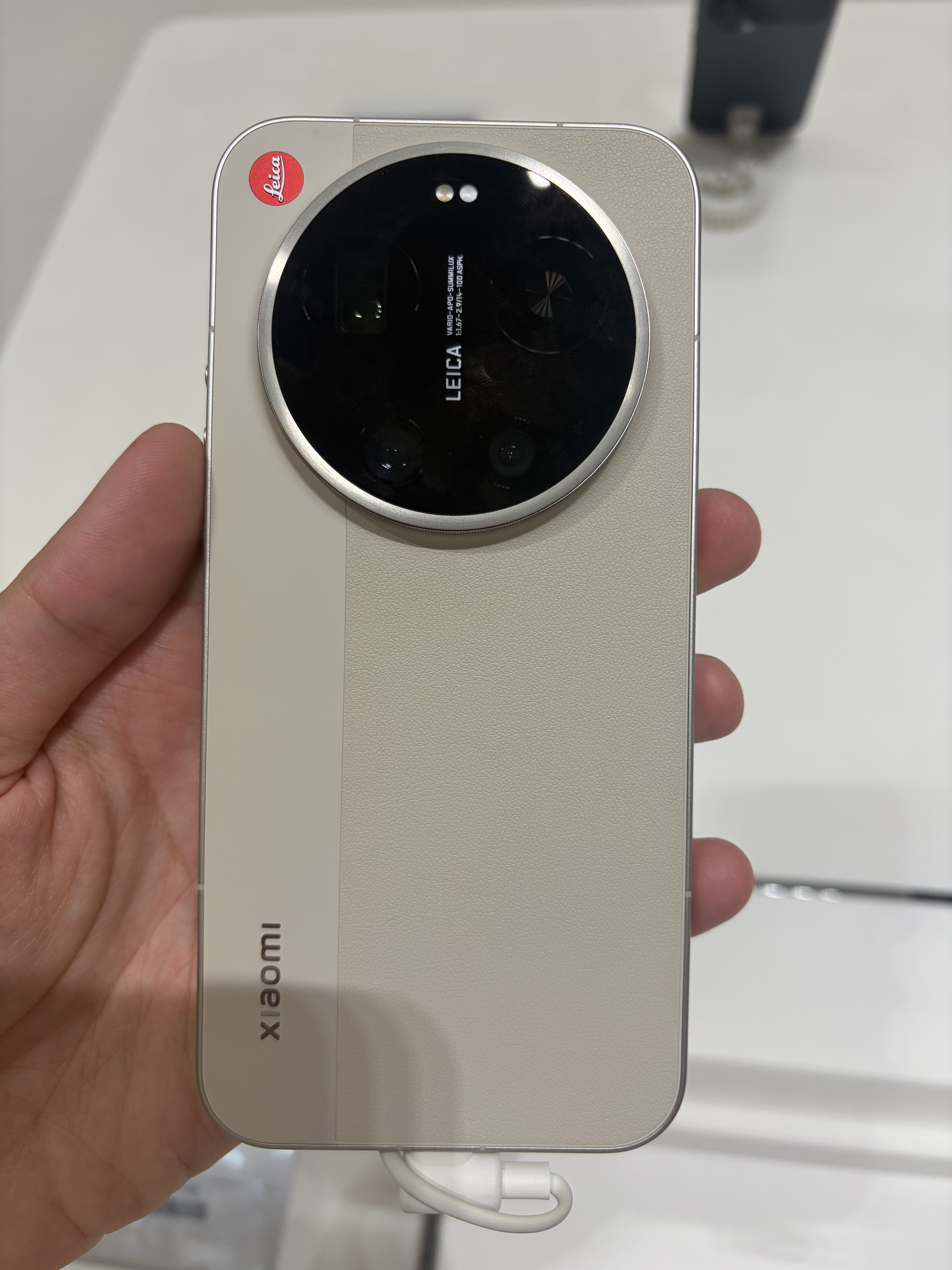
Xiaomi 17 Ultra Leica Edition in White

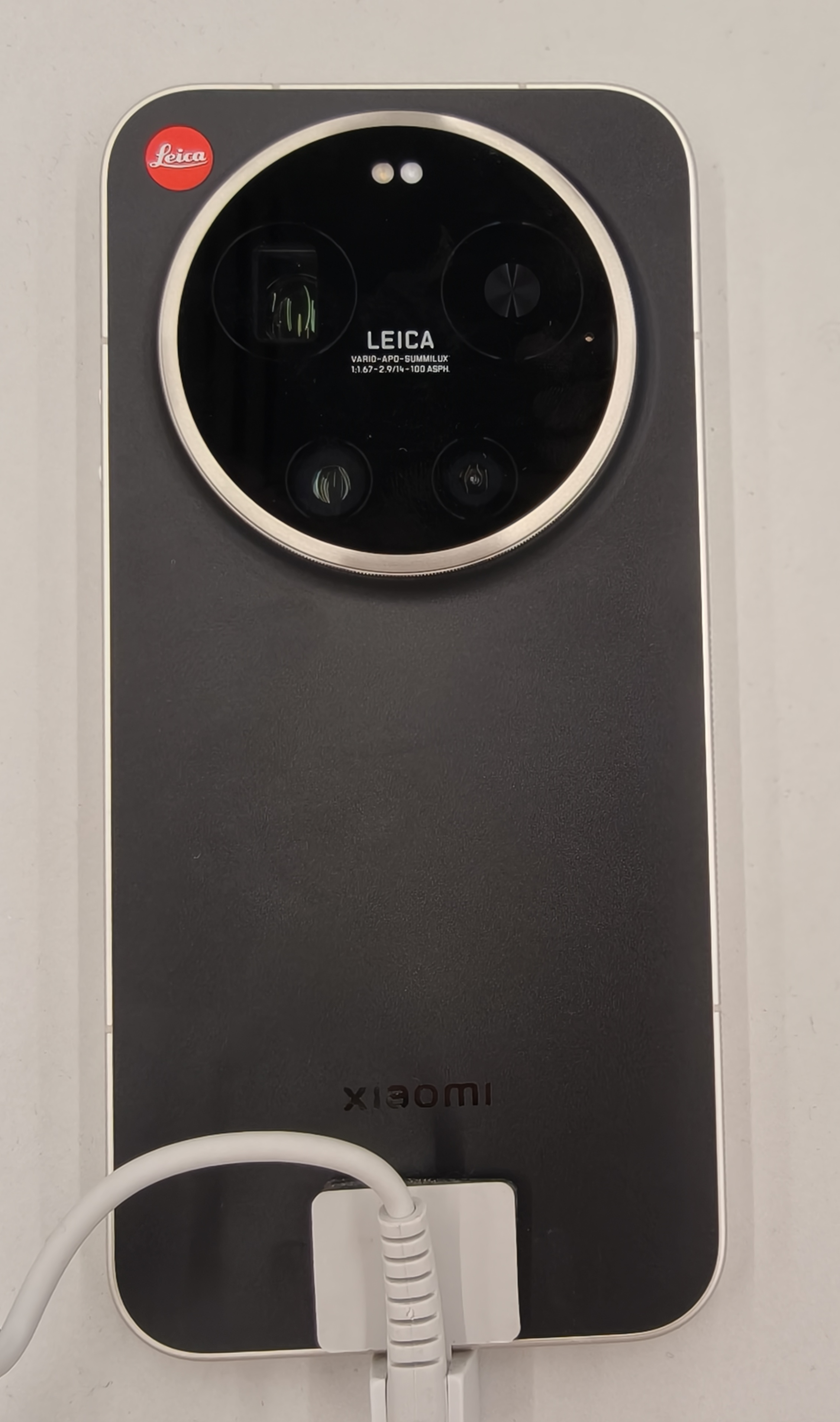
Leica Leitzphone powered by Xiaomi

On 25 December 2025, in China, alongside the Xiaomi 17 Ultra, Xiaomi introduced the Xiaomi 17 Ultra Leica Edition (Chinese: Xiaomi 17 Ultra 徕卡版). Compared to the regular Xiaomi 17 Ultra, the Xiaomi 17 Ultra Leica Edition features a knurled frame, a Red Dot Leica logo, a special system theme and the Control Ring — a mechanically rotating ring around the camera island, which zooms between focal lengths and cameras.

On 28 February 2026 at the Mobile World Congress, Leica introduced the Leica Leitzphone powered by Xiaomi, which is the global version of the Xiaomi 17 Ultra Leica Edition featuring a different back design and a smaller battery. It was launched in the international market on 6 March 2026.

== Release, reception, prices ==
The Xiaomi 17 series was released on September 25, 2025, and sold over one million units in China during its first week of release, a milestone achieved faster than its predecessor, the Xiaomi 15 series. Four models were launched: the Xiaomi 17, Xiaomi 17 Pro, Xiaomi 17 Pro Max, and Xiaomi 17 Ultra.

Only the base and Ultra models were released globally outside China, with the Pro and Pro Max exclusive to the Chinese market.
