= Xiaomi 15T =

Android high-end mid-range smartphone

Xiaomi 15T Xiaomi 15T Pro
- Back side of the Xiaomi 15T Pro in Mocaccino/Mocha Gold
- Brand: Xiaomi
- Manufacturer: Xiaomi
- Type: Smartphone
- Series: Xiaomi T
- First released: September 24, 2025; 13 months ago
- Predecessor: Xiaomi 14T
- Successor: Xiaomi 17T
- Related: Xiaomi 15
- Form factor: Slate
- Colors: 15T: Black; Gray; Rose Gold; 15T Pro: Black; Gray; Mocaccino/Mocha Gold
- Dimensions: 15T: H: 163.2 mm; W: 78 mm; D: 7.5 mm; 15T Pro: H: 162.7 mm; W: 77.9 mm; D: 7.96 mm
- Weight: 15T: 194 g 15T Pro: 210 g
- Operating system: Initial: Android 15 + Xiaomi HyperOS 2.2; Current: Android 16 + Xiaomi HyperOS 3.1
- System-on-chip: 15T: MediaTek Dimensity 8400-Ultra (4 nm); 15T Pro: MediaTek Dimensity 9400+ (4 nm)
- CPU: 15T: (1×3.25 GHz Cortex-A725 & 3×3 GHz Cortex-A725 & 4×2.1 GHz Cortex-A725); 15T Pro: Octa-core (1×3.63 GHz Cortex-X925 & 3×3.3 GHz Cortex-X4 & 4×2.4 GHz Cortex-A720)
- GPU: 15T: Mali-G720 MC7; 15T Pro: Immortalis-G925
- Memory: 12 GB LPDDR5X
- Storage: 15T: 256/512 GB; 15T Pro: 256/512 GB, 1 TB; UFS 4.1
- SIM: Dual SIM (Nano-SIM + Nano-SIM, Nano-SIM + eSIM, eSIM + eSIM)
- Battery: Non-removable 5500 mAh
- Charging: 15T: 67 W fast charging PD3.0; 15T Pro: 90 W fast charging 50 W fast wireless charging PD3.0, QC4
- Rear camera: 15T: 50 MP, f/1.7 Light Fusion 800, 23 mm (wide), 1/1.55", 1 µm, PDAF, OIS + 50 MP Samsung ISOCELL JN1, f/1.9, 46 mm (telephoto), 1/2.76", 0.64 µm, PDAF, 2x optical zoom + 12 MP OmniVision OV13B, f/2.2, 15 mm, 120° (ultrawide), 1/3.06", 1.12 µm Leica optics, Ultra HDR, color temperature sensor, LED flash, HDR, panorama; 15T Pro: 50 MP LightFusion 900 (Omnivision OV50H), f/1.6, 23 mm (wide), 1/1.31", 1.2 µm, PDAF, OIS + 50 MP Samsung ISOCELL JN1, f/3.0, 115 mm (periscope telephoto), 1/2.76", 0.64 µm, PDAF, OIS, 5x optical zoom + 12 MP, f/2.2, 15 mm (ultrawide), 1/3.06", 1.12 µm Leica optics, color temperature sensor, LED flash, HDR, panorama; Video: 15T: 4K@30 / 60fps, 1080p@30 / 60 / 120 / 240 / 960fps, 720p@30 / 120 / 240 / 960fps; gyro-EIS, 10-bit Rec. 2020, LOG, HDR10+; 15T Pro: 8K@24 / 30fps, 4K@24 / 30 / 60fps, 1080p@30 / 60 / 120 / 240 / 960fps, 720p@30 / 120 / 240 / 960fps; gyro-EIS, 10-bit Rec. 2020, LOG, HDR10+
- Front camera: 32 MP Samsung KD1, f/2.0, 21 mm (wide), 1/3.44", 0.64 µm HDR; Video: 4K@30fps, 1080p@30 / 60fps, 720p@30fps; HDR10+
- Display: Both models: AMOLED, 68B colors, 6.83", 2772 × 1280, 447 ppi, Dolby Vision, HDR10+, 19.5:9; 15T: 120 Hz; 15T Pro: 144 Hz
- Sound: Stereo speakers 24-bit/192 kHz Hi-Res and wireless Hi-Res audio
- Connectivity: USB-C 2.0 (OTG), Bluetooth 6.0 (A2DP, LE); NFC, Infrared port Wi-Fi: (dual-band, Wi-Fi Direct): 15T: 802.11 a/b/g/n/ac/6e; 15T Pro: 802.11 a/b/g/n/ac/6e/7; Satellite navigation: 15T: GPS (A-GPS; L1 + L5), GLONASS, BeiDou (B1I + B1c + B2a), Galileo (E1 + E5a), QZSS (L1 + L5), NavIC (L5); 15T Pro: GPS (A-GPS; L1 + L5), GLONASS, BeiDou (B1I + B1c + B2a + B2b), Galileo (E1 + E1a + E1b), QZSS (L1 + L5), NavIC (L5)
- Data inputs: Multi-touch sensor, 2 microphones, fingerprint scanner (under display, optical), proximity sensor, light sensor, accelerometer, gyroscope, compass
- Water resistance: IP68
- Model: 15T: 25069PTEBG; 15T Pro: 2506BPN68G, 2506BPN68R
- Codename: 15T: goya 15T Pro: klimt
- Made in: China
- Other: Xiaomi HyperAI
- Website: Xiaomi 15T Official Website; Xiaomi 15T Pro Official Website

The Xiaomi 15T and Xiaomi 15T Pro are high-end mid-range Android-based smartphones developed and manufactured by Xiaomi, serving part of the "T" series. They were introduced on September 24, 2025.

In Australia, it was released on October 10, 2025.

== Design ==
The front panel is made of Corning Gorilla Glass 7i, and the back panel is made of fibreglass. The frame of the Xiaomi 15T is made of plastic, while the Xiaomi 15T Pro frame is made of aluminium. The design of the camera island in the Xiaomi 15T series is similar to that of the Xiaomi 14T series; however, in the Xiaomi 15T series, the island features more rounded corners, a bevel around the edge, and lenses that do not protrude above the island surface. Externally, the Xiaomi 15T and Xiaomi 15T Pro can be distinguished by their frame material and the placement of the LED flash: on the base model, it is located in the bottom-right ring of the camera island, whereas on the Pro model, it is positioned to the right of the island itself.

At the bottom are the dual SIM card slot, microphone, USB-C port, and loudspeaker. On the top of the Xiaomi 15T is an additional microphone, while on the right side are the volume rocker and power button. The secondary microphone on the Xiaomi 15T Pro and the infrared port on both models are located on the back within the camera island.

The smartphones were available in the following colors:

Xiaomi 15T		Xiaomi 15T Pro	
Color	Name	Color	Name
	Black		Black
	Gray		Gray
	Rose Gold		Mocaccino/Mocha Gold

== Specifications ==
=== Hardware ===
==== Platform ====
The Xiaomi 15T is powered by the sub-flagship system on a chip MediaTek Dimensity 8400-Ultra, while the Xiaomi 15T Pro features the flagship MediaTek Dimensity 9400+.

==== Battery ====
Both models feature a 5500 mAh battery. The Xiaomi 15T supports fast wired charging up to 67 W, while the Xiaomi 15T Pro supports up to 90 W. Additionally, the Xiaomi 15T Pro supports fast wireless charging up to 50 W.

==== Camera ====
Xiaomi 15T Pro camera island

The smartphones feature a triple primary camera setup. For the Xiaomi 15T, the main setup includes a 50 MP LightFusion 800 wide-angle lens with an f/1.7 aperture, phase detection autofocus, and optical image stabilization; a 50 MP Samsung ISOCELL JN1 telephoto lens with an f/1.9 aperture, 2x optical zoom, and phase detection autofocus; and a 12 MP ultrawide lens with an f/2.2 aperture and a 120° field of view. For the Xiaomi 15T Pro, it includes a 50 MP LightFusion 900 (Omnivision OV50H) wide-angle lens with an f/1.6 aperture, phase detection autofocus, and optical image stabilization; a 50 MP Samsung ISOCELL JN1 periscope telephoto lens with an f/3.0 aperture, 5x optical zoom, phase detection autofocus, and optical image stabilization; and a 12 MP ultrawide lens with an f/2.2 aperture and a 120° field of view. The main camera of the Xiaomi 15T can record video up to 4K@60fps, while the Xiaomi 15T Pro supports up to 8K@30fps.

The cameras on the Xiaomi 15T utilize Leica Vario-Summilux 1:1.7-2.2/15-46 ASPH optics, while the Xiaomi 15T Pro features Vario-Summilux 1:1.62-3.0/15-115 ASPH optics.

Both models are equipped with a 32 MP Samsung KD1 wide-angle front-facing camera with an f/2.2 aperture and 4K@30fps video recording support.

==== Display ====
Both models feature 6.83-inch AMOLED displays with a resolution of 2772 × 1280 pixels, a pixel density of 447 ppi, a 19.5:9 aspect ratio, support for Dolby Vision and HDR10+, a centered circular cutout for the front camera, and an under-display optical fingerprint scanner. The Xiaomi 15T Pro display supports a refresh rate of up to 144 Hz, compared to the 120 Hz refresh rate of the Xiaomi 15T.

==== Sound ====
Xiaomi 15T Pro bottom speaker

The smartphones feature stereo speakers, utilizing the earpiece as the secondary speaker. Dolby Atmos support is also included.

==== Memory ====
The Xiaomi 15T comes with 256 GB or 512 GB of internal storage, while the Xiaomi 15T Pro offers 256 GB, 512 GB, or 1 TB. Both models use UFS 4.1 storage and 12 GB of LPDDR5X RAM.

=== Software ===
The smartphones shipped with Xiaomi HyperOS 2.2 based on Android 15 and were later upgraded to Xiaomi HyperOS 3.1 based on Android 16. The Xiaomi 15T and Xiaomi 15T Pro were the first smartphones to receive the global version of Xiaomi HyperOS 3.

== Reception ==
Tech Advisor reviewer Luke Baker gave 4 stars out of 5. The phone was praised for its photography quality and videography quality, which was co-engineered by Leica. However, it was criticized for its macro photography when it comes to the main sensor.

Preceded by Xiaomi 14T/Pro	Xiaomi 15T/Pro; 2025	Succeeded by Xiaomi 17T/Pro
