= Xiaomi 17 Pro =

High-end premium Android smartphones

Xiaomi 17 Pro Xiaomi 17 Pro Max
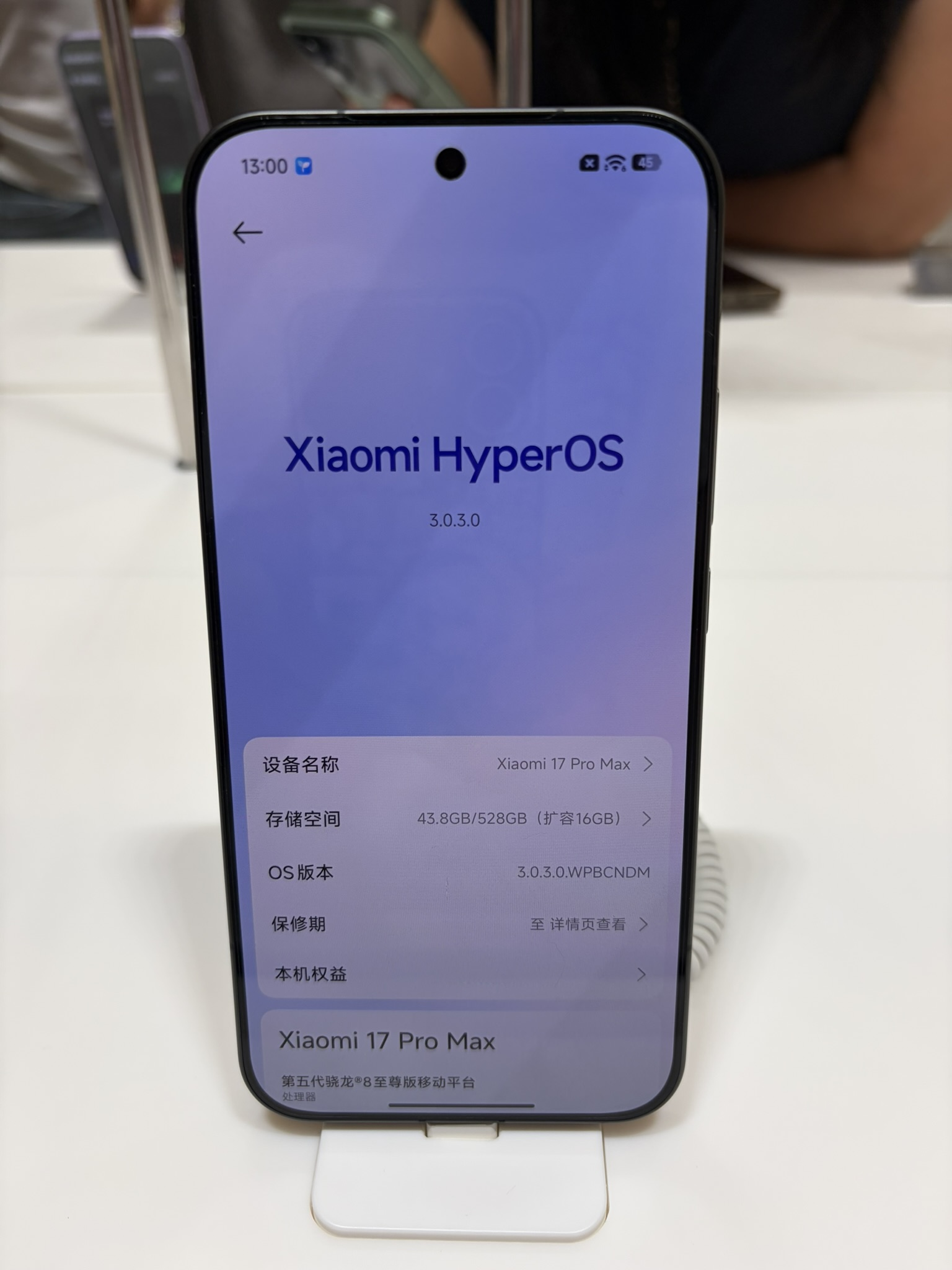
- Xiaomi 17 Pro Max
- Brand: Smartphone: Xiaomi; Camera brand: Leica
- Manufacturer: Xiaomi
- Type: Smartphone
- Series: Xiaomi series
- First released: September 25, 2025
- Availability by region: China only
- Predecessor: Xiaomi 15 Pro (for Pro)
- Successor: Xiaomi 18 Pro (for Pro)
- Related: Xiaomi 17, Xiaomi 17 Ultra
- Form factor: Slate
- Colors: Black, White, Purple, Green
- Dimensions: Pro: 151.1 mm H, 71.8 W, 8 mm D Pro Max: 162.9 mm H, 77.6 mm W, 8 mm D
- Weight: Pro: 6.77 oz (192 g); Pro Max: 7.72 oz (219 g)
- Operating system: Android 16 with HyperOS 3
- System-on-chip: Qualcomm Snapdragon 8 Elite Gen 5 (3 nm)
- CPU: Octa-core (2x4.6 GHz Oryon V3 Phoenix L + 6x3.62 GHz Oryon V3 Phoenix M)
- GPU: Adreno 840
- Memory: Pro: 12 or 16 GB LPDDR5X; Pro Max: 12 or 16 GB LPDDR5X
- Storage: Pro: 256 GB, 512 GB, or 1 TB UFS 4.1; Pro Max: 512 GB or 1 TB UFS 4.1
- Removable storage: No
- SIM: Dual SIM (Nano-SIM, dual stand-by)
- Battery: Silicon-carbon (Si/C) Li-ion; Pro: 6300 mAh; Pro Max: 7500 mAh
- Charging: 100W wired (PD3.0, QC3+, PPS), 50W wireless, 22.5W reverse wireless
- Rear camera: Triple camera Setup: Wide (Main): 50 MP, f/1.7, 23mm, 1/1.28", 1.22µm, dual pixel PDAF, OIS; Periscope Telephoto (5x optical zoom): 50 MP, 115mm, 1/1.95", 0.8µm (Pro Max: f/2.6) / 1/2.76", 0.64µm (Pro: f/3.0), PDAF, OIS; Ultrawide (102°): 50 MP, f/2.4, 17mm, 1/2.76", 0.64µm (Pro) / 1/2.88", 0.61µm (Pro Max, PDAF); Features: Leica lens, Laser AF, color spectrum sensor, Dual-LED dual-tone flash, HDR, panorama; Video: 8K@30fps (HDR), 4K@30/60/120fps (HDR10+, 10-bit Dolby Vision HDR, 10-bit LOG), 1080p@30/60/120/240/960fps, 720p@1920fps, gyro-EIS
- Front camera: 50 MP, f/2.2, 21mm (wide), 1/2.88", 0.61µm, PDAF, HDR, panorama Video: 4K@30/60fps, 1080p@30/60fps, HDR10+, gyro-EIS
- Display: Main display: LTPO AMOLED capacitive touchscreen, 68B colors, 120Hz, Dolby Vision, HDR10+, HDR Vivid, 3500 nits (peak); Pro: 6.3 in (160 mm), 1220 x 2656 pixels (~464 ppi), Xiaomi Dragon Crystal Glass; Pro Max: 6.9 in (180 mm), 1200 x 2608 pixels (~416 ppi), Xiaomi Dragon Crystal Glass 3 Secondary display (rear): LTPO AMOLED, 120Hz, Dolby Vision, HDR10+, HDR Vivid, 3500 nits (peak); Pro: 2.7 in (69 mm), 572 x 904 pixels Pro Max: 2.9 in (74 mm), 596 x 976 pixels
- Sound: Stereo speakers with Dolby Atmos, 24-bit/192kHz Hi-Res & Hi-Res wireless audio, Snapdragon Sound; No 3.5 mm audio jack
- Connectivity: Wi-Fi 7 (802.11 a/b/g/n/ac/6e/7, dual-band, Wi-Fi Direct); Bluetooth 5.4 (A2DP, LE, aptX HD, aptX Adaptive, LHDC 5); GPS (L1+L5), BDS (B1I+B1c+B2a), GALILEO (E1+E5a), QZSS (L1+L5), NavIC (L5), GLONASS; NFC; Infrared port USB Type-C 3.2, DisplayPort, OTG
- Data inputs: Fingerprint scanner (under display, ultrasonic), accelerometer, proximity sensor, gyroscope, compass, barometer Ultra Wideband (UWB) support
- Water resistance: IP68 dust/water resistant Pro: up to 4m for 30 min Pro Max: up to 6m for 30 min
- Model: 25098PN5AC (Pro); 2509FPN0BC (Pro Max)
- Development status: Available

The Xiaomi 17 Pro and Xiaomi 17 Pro Max are high-end premium Android-based smartphones developed, designed, and marketed by Chinese electronic consumer Xiaomi, serving as part of the Xiaomi 17 series. Announced on 25 September 2025 at the 2025 Annual Speech in Beijing hosted by Lei Jun, it has a battery capacity of 6300 mAh and 7500 mAh for the Pro Max variant.

== Release ==
As part of the Xiaomi 17 series, the Pro and Pro Max was exclusively released in China on September 25, 2025. It was expected that countries outside China will be launched next year.

== Technical specifications ==
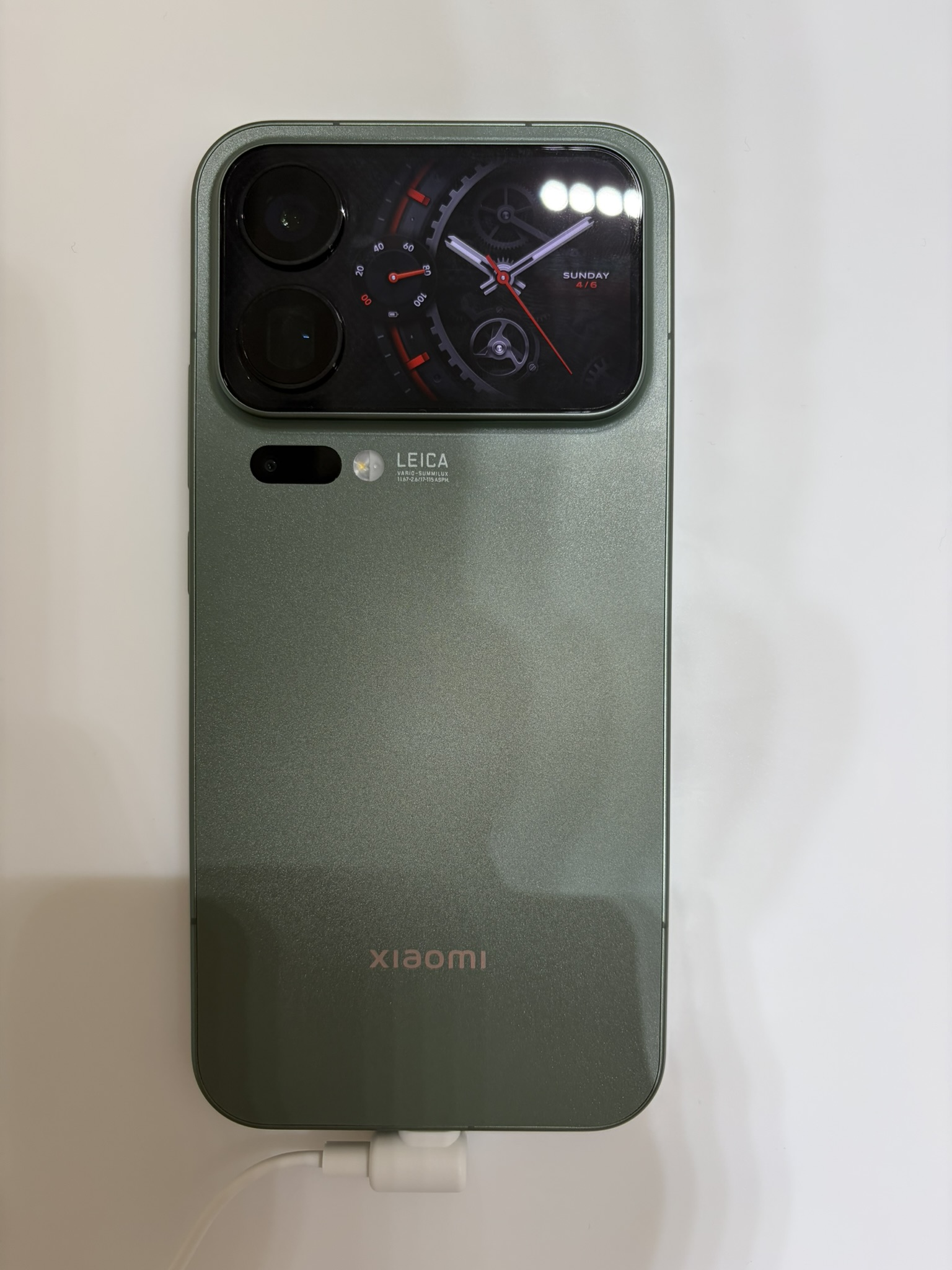
Rear of the Xiaomi 17 Pro Max

=== Design ===
Both phones feature a premium built around an aluminum frame with a matte glass rear finish. The physical footprint differs heavily based on screen dimensions:

- Xiaomi 17 Pro measures 151.1 x 71.8 x 8 mm and weighs 192 grams.
- Xiaomi 17 Pro Max: measures 162.9 x 77.6 x 8 mm and weighs 219 grams.

The front of the Pro version is protected by Xiaomi Dragon Crystal Glass, while the Pro Max introduces Xiaomi Shield Glass 3.0 (also marketed as Dragon Crystal Glass 3) for enhanced drop and scratch durability. Both devices feature an IP68 dust and water resistance rating, allowing immersion up to 4 meters (Pro) or 6 meters (Pro Max) for up to 30 minutes.

A distinctive design for the 17 Pro and 17 Pro Max is the inclusion of a fully functional Dynamic Back Display (secondary display) located next to the rear camera module. This gives a shortcut feature to customize and control, quoted from the Chinese entrepreneur Lei Jun "(The) Xiaomi 17 Pro and Xiaomi 17 Pro Max introduce a revolutionary dual-screen design that blends sophisticated aesthetics with intuitive, intelligent functionality. The Dynamic Back Display enhances lifestyle and efficiency under various scenarios: customizable watch faces, AI wallpapers, virtual pets, dynamic information notifications, sticky notes, and so much more."

It also comes with an integrated third-generation pet named "Pangda" the panda, which performs vivid actions based on different scenarios and also interacts with user gestures.

The smartphones are sold in four primary color options: Black, White, Purple, and Green.

=== Hardware ===
==== Displays ====
The primary front screens utilize LTPO AMOLED technology capable of reproducing 68 billion colors with a 120 Hz refresh rate, 2160 Hz PWM dimming, Dolby Vision, HDR10+, and an outdoor peak brightness of 3,500 nits.

- The Xiaomi 17 Pro houses a 6.3-inch display with a resolution of 1220 x 2656 pixels (~464 ppi density).
- The Xiaomi 17 Pro Max stretches to a 6.9-inch display with a resolution of 1200 x 2608 pixels (~416 ppi density). The Pro Max panel also integrates an exclusive independent pixel array technology to improve display sharpness at lower power levels.

The rear secondary screens are also built on premium LTPO AMOLED panels supporting 120 Hz and Dolby Vision. The Pro variant features a 2.7-inch panel (572 x 904 pixels), while the Pro Max has a 2.9-inch panel (596 x 976 pixels).

==== Chipset and memory ====
The models were powered by the Qualcomm Snapdragon 8 Elite Gen 5 system-on-chip processor, an octa-core processor fabricated on a 3-nanometer node. The CPU layout includes 2x 4.6 GHz Oryon V3 Phoenix Large cores and 6x 3.62 GHz Oryon V3 Phoenix Medium cores, paired with an Adreno 840 GPU.

Storage configurations rely on high-speed UFS 4.1 flash memory, while RAM utilizes LPDDR5X channels. The 17 Pro options span from 256GB/12GB RAM up to 1TB/16GB RAM, while the Pro Max skips the 256GB base tier, starting at 512GB/12GB RAM. Storage expansion via MicroSD is not supported.

==== Camera system ====
Co-engineered with Leica, both smartphones carry a triple 50-megapixel rear array and a 50-megapixel front camera, though sensor properties vary:

- Main Camera uses a 50 MP Light Fusion 950L (1/1.28-inch size) sensor with an f/1.7 aperture, 23mm focal length, Dual Pixel PDAF, and Optical Image Stabilization (OIS). It leverages next-generation LOFIC technology to achieve a 16.5EV dynamic range.
- Periscope Telephoto - models both feature a 5x optical zoom (115mm equivalent) with OIS. The Pro Max features a larger 1/1.95-inch sensor with hardware-level HDR support, while the Pro variant relies on an inverted floating lens mechanism optimized for a close-focusing 20 cm macro range.
- Ultrawide Camera - 50 MP sensor with an f/2.4 aperture and a 17mm focal length.

The main camera arrangement is capable of recording video at up to 8K resolution at 30fps and 4K at up to 120fps with 10-bit Dolby Vision HDR and LOG profiles.

==== Battery and connectivity ====
Battery capacities set industry standards for flagships of their physical scale due to the high-density Silicon-Carbon cell technology. The Xiaomi 17 Pro includes a 6,300 mAh battery, while the Pro Max boasts a 7,500 mAh battery. Lab tests indicate an Active Use score of 20 hours and 50 minutes, a video playback of 29 hours, and a gaming of 11 hours and 29 minutes on the Pro Max model.

Both devices support 100W wired charging (utilizing PD3.0 and PPS protocols), 50W wireless charging, and 22.5W reverse wireless charging capabilities.

Connectivity includes Wi-Fi 7, Bluetooth 5.4, NFC, an infrared port, an ultrasonic under-display fingerprint sensor, and Ultra Wideband (UWB) support.

=== Software ===
The devices ship natively with HyperOS 3, layered on top of the Android 16 operating system. The software ecosystem introduces massive optimization enhancements for the dual-screen configuration, intelligent context management to drop the LTPO displays down to 1 Hz when idling, and comprehensive AI features powered by the local neural processing units built into the Snapdragon platform.

== Reception ==
In terms of design, PhoneArena critic Abdullah Asim flags the smartphone as an "excellent device", but it was criticized for its copied version of the Apple iPhone 17 Pro. With the HyperOS 3 user interface, it was seamlessly identical to the iOS 26 user interface. It was also noticed by Huawei Central reviewer Emiko Matsui.

GSMArena flagged positive for the secondary display, the battery life, the UWB support, and the fast charging support, but it was criticized for its camera system and performance at its maximum potential.
