= Xiaomi 17T =

Android mid-range smartphone series

Xiaomi 17T Xiaomi 17T Pro

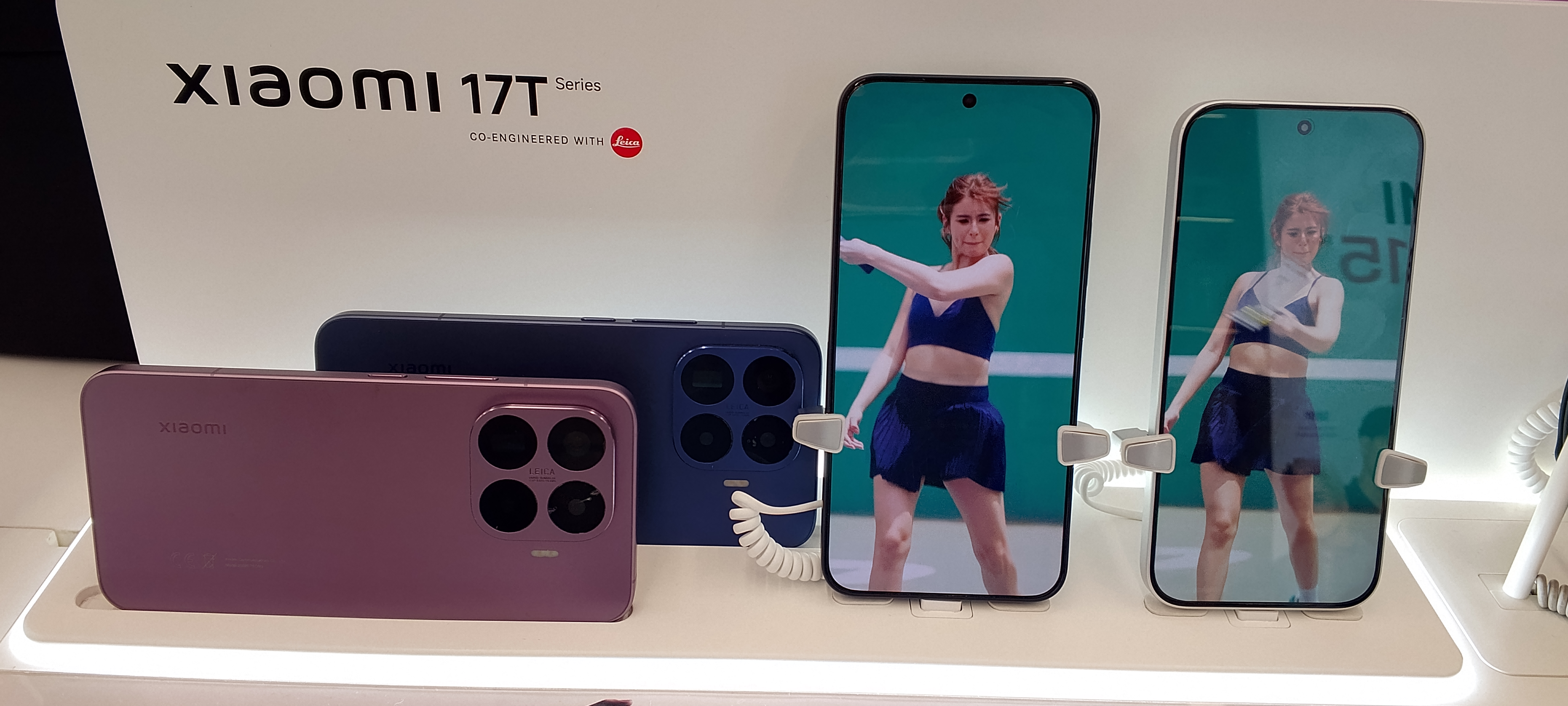
- Front and back views of the Xiaomi 17T, with Xiaomi 17 Pro at the left (right-side positioned)
- Brand: Xiaomi
- Manufacturer: Xiaomi
- Series: Xiaomi "T" series
- First released: May 28, 2026; 4 months ago
- Availability by region: May 28, 2026: Malaysia; Singapore; Italy; Germany; Spain; France; United Kingdom; May 29, 2026: South Korea; Philippines
- Predecessor: Xiaomi 15T
- Related: Xiaomi 17 series
- Compatible networks: 2G, 3G, 4G LTE, 5G
- Form factor: Slate
- Colors: 17T: Violet, Blue, Opal White, Black; 17T Pro: Deep Blue, Deep Violet, Black
- Dimensions: 17T: 157.6 × 75.2 × 8.2 mm 17T Pro: 162.2 × 77.5 × 8.3 mm
- Weight: 200 g (7.1 oz)
- Operating system: Android 16 with HyperOS 3
- System-on-chip: 17T: Mediatek Dimensity 8500 Ultra (4 nm); 17T Pro: Mediatek Dimensity 9500 (3 nm)
- CPU: 17T: 1× 3.4 GHz Cortex-A725 + 3× 3.2 GHz Cortex-A725 + 4× 2.2 GHz Cortex-A725; 17T Pro: 1× 4.21 GHz C1-Ultra + 3× 3.5 GHz C1-Premium + 4× 2.7 GHz C1-Pro
- GPU: 17T: Mali-G720 MC8; 17T Pro: Mali-G1 Ultra MC12
- Memory: 17T: 8 GB or 12 GB LPDDR5X; 17T Pro: 12 GB or 16 GB LPDDR5X
- Storage: 256 GB or 512 GB UFS 4.0
- Battery: 17T: 6,500 mAh; 7,000 mAh (China); 17T Pro: 7,000 mAh; Si/C Li-Ion (non-removable)
- Charging: 17T: 67W fast charging + 50W PPS, PD3.0; 17T Pro: 100W Fast Charging + PPS, PD3.0; Reverse charging Both models: 22.5W; Wireless charging (17T Pro only); 50W
- Rear camera: Triple camera system: • 50 MP (wide), OIS • 50 MP (telephoto) • 12 MP (ultrawide); 8K@24fps, 4K@30/60fps, Leica lenses
- Front camera: 32 MP, f/2.0 (wide), 1008p@30fps
- Display: 6.67 in (169 mm) AMOLED, 1220 x 2712 pixels, 144 Hz refresh rate, HDR10+, Dolby Vision
- Sound: Stereo speakers, Dolby Atmos, No 3.5mm jack
- Connectivity: Wi-Fi 7, Bluetooth 5.4, NFC, Infrared port, USB Type-C 2.0
- Data inputs: Fingerprint (under display, optical), accelerometer, gyro, proximity, compass
- Website: https://www.mi.com/global/product/xiaomi-17t/

The Xiaomi 17T and Xiaomi 17T Pro are Android-based upper mid-range and flagship smartphones manufactured, designed, and marketed by Xiaomi, serving part of the "T" series. The 17T series was released on May 28, 2026. It was later released on May 29, 2026, for South Korean and Philippine markets. In China, the phone was released on June 8.

== Specifications ==
=== Design ===
The Xiaomi 17T features dimensions of 157.6 mm × 75.2 mm × 8.2 mm and weighs 200 grams. The construction features a Corning Gorilla Glass 7i front display panel, a plastic intermediate frame, and a back panel constructed from glass-fiber reinforced plastic that uses a Gorilla Glass 7i formulation. It is available in Violet, Blue, Opal White, and Black finishes.

The Xiaomi 17T Pro features a larger footprint, measuring 162.2 mm × 77.5 mm × 8.3 mm and weighing 219 grams. It upgrades the structural material to an aluminum alloy frame and uses standard glass on the rear panel alongside its Gorilla Glass 7i front protection. Color variants for this model include Deep Blue, Deep Violet, and Black.

Both variants carry an IP68 certification under IEC standard 60529, providing dust tightness and water resistance for submersion up to 1.5 meters for a duration of 30 minutes.

=== Hardware ===
==== Display ====
Both smartphones utilize high-frequency Pulse Width Modulation (PWM) dimming at 3840 Hz to alleviate visual fatigue at lower brightness settings. The panels support standard high dynamic range formats including HDR10+ and Dolby Vision, with a rated peak brightness of 3500 nits. The glass on both models displays scratch resistance rated up to Mohs level 5.

===== Display type & size =====
- Xiaomi 17T was equipped with a 6.59-inch AMOLED display with a resolution of 1268 × 2756 pixels (~460 ppi density) and a 120 Hz refresh rate.
- Xiaomi 17T Pro was built with a larger 6.83-inch AMOLED display featuring a slightly higher 1280 × 2772 pixel resolution (~447 ppi density) and an increased maximum refresh rate of 144 Hz.

==== Chipset and Memory ====
The internal hardware configurations rely entirely on MediaTek Dimensity system-on-chips built on advanced fabrication processes, using UFS 4.1 for internal flash memory. Neither phone supports expandable storage via microSD cards.

- Xiaomi 17T: Powered by a 4-nanometer MediaTek Dimensity 8500 Ultra chipset. It uses an octa-core central processing unit (CPU) consisting of one high-performance Cortex-A725 core clocked at 3.4 GHz, three Cortex-A725 cores at 3.2 GHz, and four efficiency-focused Cortex-A725 cores at 2.2 GHz. Graphical processing is handled by a Mali-G720 MC8 GPU. It is offered in storage capacities of 256 GB or 512 GB, both paired with 12 GB of LPDDR5X RAM integrated with UFS 4.1.
- Xiaomi 17T Pro: Upgrades to a 3-nanometer MediaTek Dimensity 9500 chipset. The CPU architecture includes one "C1-Ultra" core operating at 4.21 GHz, three "C1-Premium" cores running at 3.5 GHz, and four "C1-Pro" cores at 2.7 GHz. Graphics are driven by a Mali-G1 Ultra MC12 GPU. Storage tiers range from 256 GB, 512 GB, up to 1 TB, all utilizing 12 GB of RAM.

==== Cameras ====
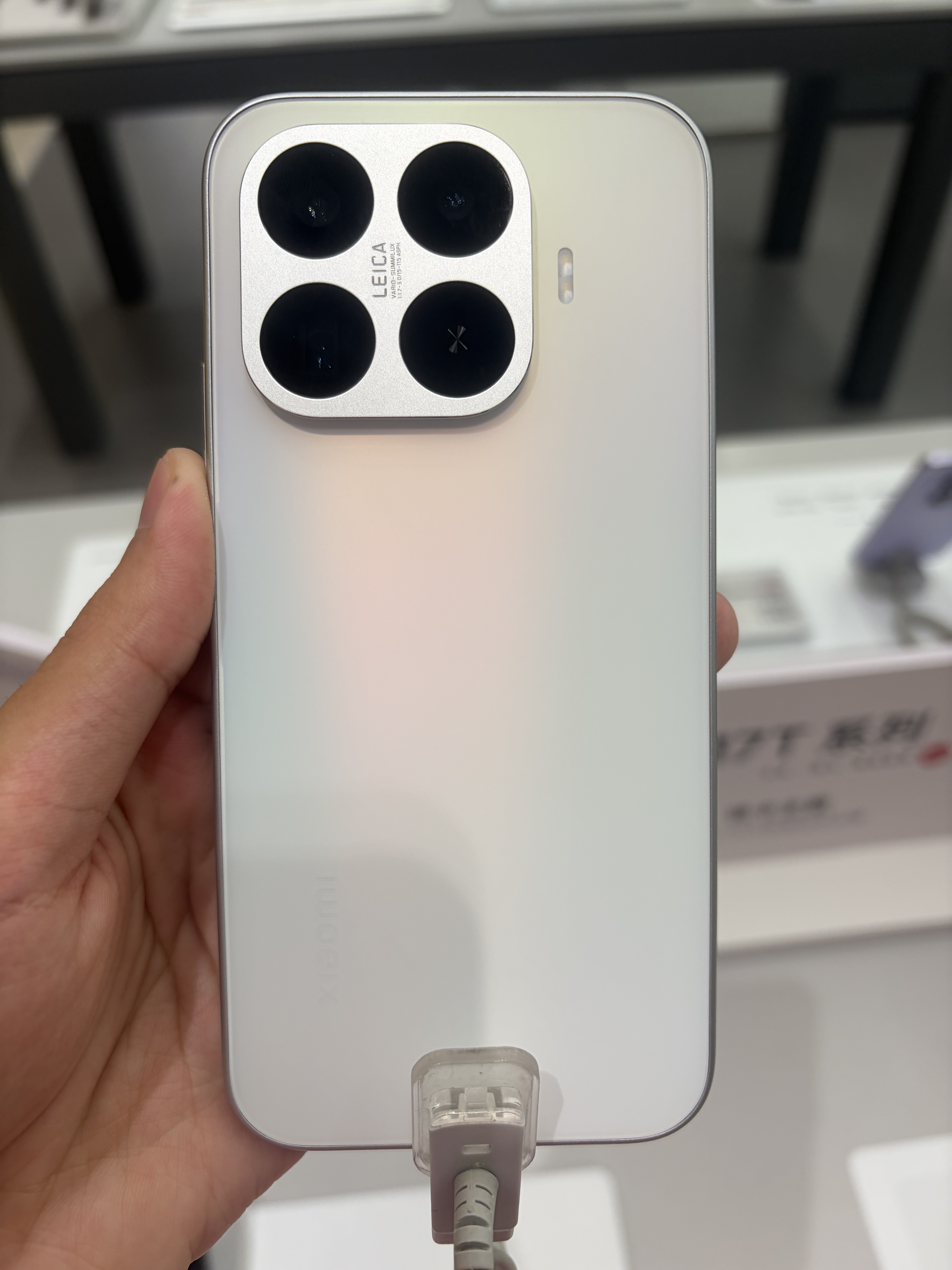
Rear panel of the Xiaomi 17T

The primary camera modules are co-engineered with Leica, featuring integrated Leica lenses and dedicated color spectrum sensors for improved color fidelity.

- 50 MP (wide), OIS
- 50 MP (telephoto)
- 12 MP (ultrawide)

The primary camera on the 17T relies on a 1/1.55-inch sensor, while the 17T Pro upgrades to a larger 1/1.31-inch sensor utilizing multi-directional phase-detection autofocus (PDAF). Both devices share an identical secondary 50 MP periscope telephoto lens providing 5x optical zoom and 120x AI ultra-zoom (f/3.0 aperture with optical image stabilization) and a 12 MP ultrawide lens with a 120-degree field of view.

Video capture capabilities diverge at the top tier: the standard 17T maxes out at 4K resolution at 30 or 60 frames per second (fps), whereas the 17T Pro supports up to 8K recording at 30 fps alongside high-frame-rate 4K capture up to 120 fps. Front-facing cameras across both models use a single 32 MP sensor capable of 4K video recording at 30 fps.

==== Battery and Charging ====
Both models leverage Silicon-Carbon (Si/C) lithium-ion battery chemistry to increase energy density relative to physical volume.

- Xiaomi 17T features a 6500 mAh battery capacity. It supports 67W wired charging, as well as 50W Programmable Power Supply (PPS) and Power Delivery 3.0 (PD3.0) standards. It also features 22.5W reverse wired charging.
- Xiaomi 17T Pro was upgraded to a higher 7000 mAh battery capacity. Wired charging speeds are supported up to 100W via proprietary protocols, Quick Charge 4 (QC4), or PPS. It adds 50W wireless charging support alongside standard 22.5W reverse wired charging capabilities.

=== Software ===
The Xiaomi 17T series ships with the Android 16 operating system layered beneath Xiaomi's proprietary HyperOS 3 user interface. This version introduces customized ecosystem integration, system-level visual changes, and performance adjustments intended to optimize scheduling on the underlying MediaTek Dimensity heterogeneous multi-core architectures.
