= List of LG mobile phones =

== LG Mobile phones abbreviations ==
- B stand for Broadcast Models T-DMB/S-DMB/DVB-H/DVB-T/ISDB-T/MediaFLO
- C stand for US GSM/3G
- F stand for Fashion
- G stand for GSM
- K stand for Europe GSM/3G
- M stand for Latin America
- R stand for India
- S stand for SK Telecom CDMA / Smartphone
- T stand for Canada & Australia
- U stand for UMTS/WCDMA/3G
- V stand for Verizon CDMA

== Canadian market models ==
=== TE series ===
- LG TE365 (Neon)

=== TU series ===
- LG TU330 (Globus)
- LG TU500
- LG TU515
- LG TU750 (Secret)
- LG TU915 (Vu)

== US market models ==
- LG 4NE1

=== US Cellular CDMA models ===
- LG Genesis (US760)

=== CB series ===
- LG CB630

=== CE series ===
- LG CE100
- LG CE110

=== CF series ===
- LG CF360

=== CG series ===
- LG CG180
- LG CG225
- LG CG300

=== CU series ===
- LG CU400
- LG CU405
- LG CU500
- LG CU500v
- LG CU515
- LG CU575 (Trax)
- LG CU720 (Shine)
- LG CU915/CU920 (Vu)

=== LG series ===
- LG 100C
- LG 102
- LG 108CB
- LG 109C
- LG 200C
- LG 220C
- LG 221C
- LG 230
- LG 231C
- LG 235C
- LG 236C
- LG 237C
- LG 290C
- LG 300G
- LG 305C
- LG 306G
- LG 320G
- LG 325G
- LG 328BG
- LG 329G
- LG 400G
- LG 410G
- LG 420G
- LG 430G
- LG 440G
- LG 441G
- LG 442BG
- LG 500G
- LG 501C
- LG 505C
- LG 511C
- LG 530G
- LG 600G
- LG 620G
- LG 800G
- LG 840G
- LG 900G
- LG 1010
- LG 1500
- LG 3280

=== LX series ===
- LX125
- LX140 (Aloha)
- LX150
- LX160
- LX165 (Flare)
- LX225
- LX260 (Rumor)
- LX265 (Rumor 2)
- LX325
- LX350
- LX370
- LX400
- LX600 (Lotus)
- LX610 (Lotus Elite)
- LX1200
- LX5225(VI5225)(LX5400)
- LX5250(TP5250)
- LX5350
- LX5450
- LX5550
- LX5550 no camera

=== Optimus series ===
- P500 Optimus one
- P504 Optimus one (USA)
- P505 Thrive
- P506 Phoenix
- P509 Optimus T
- VS660 Vortex
- LS670 Optimus S
- US670 Optimus U
- VM670 Optimus V
- MS690 Optimus M

=== Verizon CDMA models ===
==== VS series ====
- LG VS660 (Vortex)
- LG VS700 (Enlighten)
- LG VS740 (Ally)
- LG VS880 (LG G Vista™)
- LG VS920 (Spectrum)
- LG VS930 (Spectrum 2)

==== VX series ====
- LG VX1
- LG VX10
- LG VX1000 (Migo)
- LG VX2000
- LG VX3100
- LG VX3200
- LG VX3300
- LG VX3400
- LG VX3450
- LG VX4400
- LG VX4500
- LG VX4600
- LG VX4650
- LG VX4700
- LG VX5200
- LG VX5300
- LG VX5400
- LG VX5500
- LG VX5600 (Accolade)
- LG VX6000
- LG VX6100
- LG VX7000
- LG VX7100 (Glance)
- LG VX8000 (2004)
- LG VX8100
- LG VX8300
- LG VX8350
- LG VX8360
- LG VX8370 (Clout)
- LG VX8500 (Chocolate)
- LG VX8550 (Chocolate 2)
- LG VX8560 (Chocolate 3)
- LG VX8575 (Chocolate Touch)
- LG VX8600
- LG VX8700
- LG VX8800 (Venus)
- LG VX9000
- LG VX9100 (enV2)
- LG VX9200 (enV3)
- LG VX9400
- LG VX9600 (Versa)
- LG VX9700 (Dare)
- LG VX9800 (The V)
- LG VX9900 (enV)
- LG VX10000 (Voyager)
- LG VX11000 (enV Touch)

== European market models ==
=== Optimus G series ===
- LG Optimus G
- LG Optimus G Pro
- LG G2
- LG G3
- LG G4
- LG G5
- LG G6
- LG G7
- LG G8
- * LG Velvet 2 Pro (unreleased, with a few units appearing in grey market)
- LG Velvet (Dimensity 1000c Variant)
- LG Velvet
- LG G3 Stylus
- LG G4 Stylus
- LG G Flex
- LG G Flex 2
- LG G Pad 8.3
- LG G Pro 2
- LG L22 (G2 Japan)

=== GC series ===
- LG GC900 (Viewty Smart)

=== GD series ===
- LG GD230
- LG GD510 (LG Pop)
- LG GD570 (dLite)

=== GS series ===
- LG GS290 (Cookie Fresh)
- LG GS500v (Cookie Plus)
- LG GS155a
- LG GS108

=== GT series ===
- LG GT540 Optimus

=== GW series ===
- LG GW300
- LG GW370
- LG GW525 cookie
- LG GW620 Eve
- LG GW820 eXpo

=== GX series ===
- LG GX200
- LG GX300
- LG GX500

=== KC series ===
- LG KC910 Renoir
- LG KC550

=== KE series ===
- LG KE500
- LG KE850 (Prada)
- LG KE970 (Shine)

=== KF series ===
- LG KF245
- LG KF300
- LG KF310
- LG KF311
- LG KF390
- LG KF510
- LG KF600
- LG KF700
- LG KF750 (Secret)
- LG KF900 (Prada II)

=== KG series ===
- LG KG110
- LG KG130
- LG KG190
- LG KG195
- LG KG200
- LG KG210
- LG KG220
- LG KG225
- LG KG270
- LG KG280 (Chocolate)
- LG KG288 with am/fm radio
- LG KG300 Perfect Multimedia
- LG KG320
- LG KG600 (Same as KF600)
- LG KG800 chocolate
- LG KG920

=== KM series ===
- LG KM380
- LG KM570 Cookie Gig
- LG KM900 Arena

=== KP series ===
- LG KP100
- LG KP105
- LG KP110
- LG KP115
- LG KP130
- LG KP150
- LG KP170
- LG KP199
- LG KP200
- LG KP202
- LG KP210
- LG KP215
- LG KP220
- LG KP230
- LG KP233
- LG KP235
- LG KP260
- LG KP265
- LG KP270
- LG KP320
- LG KP330
- LG Cookie (KP500)

=== KS series ===
- LG KS20 tv.out phone
- LG KS360
- LG KS500
- LG KS365

=== KU series ===
- LG KU830
- LG KU970 (Shine 3G)
- LG KU990R

== Latin American market models ==
=== ME series ===
- LG ME500
- LG ME600

=== MG series ===
- LG MG100
- LG MG105
- LG MG110
- LG MG125 (1)
- LG MG130
- LG MG140
- LG MG150
- LG MG155 (Onix)
- LG MG160
- LG MG170
- LG MG180
- LG MG185
- LG MG200
- LG MG220
- LG MG225 (Butterfly)
- LG MG230 (Black Crystal)
- LG MG235
- LG MG320 (Aegis)
- LG MG370 (Lync)
- LG MG377
- LG MG810 (Black Zafiro)

=== PM series ===
- LG PM225
- LG PM325

== Early 3G UMTS models ==
=== U series ===
- LG K8000 (aka G8000)
- LG U8110
- LG U8120
- LG U8138
- LG U8180
- LG U8210
- LG U8260
- LG U8330
- LG U8360
- LG U8380
- LG U8500
- LG U300
- LG U400
- LG U830 (Chocolate 3G Folder)
- LG U900 - the World's First DVB-H Phone
- LG U960
- LG U990

== Optimus series ==
- Optimus GT540
- Optimus 3D P920
- Optimus 3D Max P720
- Optimus 2X SU660
- Optimus 7 E900
- LS670 Optimus S
- MS690 Optimus M
- Optimus One P500
- Optimus Net P690 (also called Optimus Spirit P690)
- Optimus Me P350
- Optimus Black P970
- Optimus Chic E720
- Optimus Sol E730
- Optimus 2X P990
- Optimus 4X HD P880
- P509 Optimus T
- US670 Optimus U
- VM670 Optimus V
- VS660 Vortex
- Optimus L3 E400
- Optimus L3 II E430
- Optimus L4 II E440
- LG Optimus L5 E610
- LG Optimus L7 P700
- LG Optimus L9 P760
- LG Optimus L70
- LG Optimus L90

== LG Android series ==
- Model L56.0

== Other series ==
=== New Cell Phones ► Smartphone ===
- LG Q92 5G
- LG K51
- LG K52
- LG W41
- LG W41 Pro
- LG X2

== V & Q Series ==
- LG V60 ThinQ
- LG V50S ThinQ
- LG V50 ThinQ
- LG V40 ThinQ
- LG V35 ThinQ
- LG V30S ThinQ
- LG V30
- LG V30 (Japan-only 32GB variant)
- LG V20
- LG V10
- LG Q9
- LG Q8
- LG Q7+
- LG Q7
- LG Q6+
- LG Q6

== G Series ==
- LG G8x ThinQ
- LG G8s ThinQ
- LG G8 ThinQ
- LG G7+ ThinQ
- LG G7 ThinQ
- LG G6+ ThinQ
- LG G6
- LG G5
- LG G4
- LG G3
- LG G2
- LG Optimus G

=== Models that end with GO ===
- LG A100GO
- LG A133GO
- LG A140GO
- LG A170GO
- LG A225GO
- LG AX145GO
- LG AX155GO
- LG AX260GO
- LG AX265GO
- LG AX275GO
- LG AX310GO
- LG B2050GO
- LG B2100GO
- LG BL20GO
- LG C1100GO
- LG C2200GO
- LG C3300GO
- LG C3310GO
- LG C3320GO
- LG C300GO
- LG CF360GO
- LG CF360GO1

=== A series ===
- LG A7110
- LG A7150
- LG A100
- LG A100A
- LG A100GO
- LG A108
- LG A110
- LG A120
- LG A130
- LG A133
- LG A133CH
- LG A133GO
- LG A133R
- LG A140
- LG A140GO
- LG A155
- LG A160
- LG A165
- LG A170
- LG A170GO
- LG A175
- LG A175A
- LG A175B
- LG A180
- LG A180A
- LG A180B
- LG A190
- LG A190B
- LG A200
- LG A210A
- LG A210AN
- LG A210B
- LG A225
- LG A225GO
- LG A230
- LG A235
- LG A250
- LG A255
- LG A258
- LG A260
- LG A270
- LG A270E
- LG A271
- LG A275
- LG A290
- LG A310
- LG A310F
- LG A340
- LG A341
- LG A350
- LG A353
- LG A395
- LG A447

=== AD series ===
- LG AD2535
- LG AD2635
- LG AD3335
- LG AD5235
- LG AD5435
- LG AD600
- LG AD6335

=== AX series ===
- LG AX140
- LG AX145
- LG AX145GO
- LG AX155
- LG AX155GO
- LG AX245
- LG AX260 (Scoop)
- LG AX260GO
- LG AX265
- LG AX265GO
- LG AX275GO
- LG AX275SV
- LG AX275PK
- LG AX300
- LG AX310
- LG AX3100
- LG AX310GO
- LG AX3200
- LG AX355
- LG AX380 (Wave)
- LG AX390
- LG AX4270
- LG AX4750
- LG AX490 (Fastap)
- LG AX500 (Swift)
- LG AX5000
- LG AX5450
- LG AX5550
- LG AX565
- LG AX585 (Rhythm)
- LG AX8100
- LG AX830 (Glimmer)
- LG AX8370 (Clout)
- LG AX840A (Tritan)
- LG AX8575 (8575 Touch)(Touch)
- LG AX8600

=== B series ===
- LG B1100
- LG B1200
- LG B1300
- LG B2000
- LG B2050
- LG B2050GO
- LG B2060
- LG B2070
- LG B2100
- LG B2100GO
- LG B2150
- LG B2250

=== BD series ===
- LG BD2030
- LG BD2233
- LG BD4000
- LG BD5130
- LG BD6070

=== BL series ===
- LG BL20
- LG BL20cf
- LG BL20E
- LG BL20GO
- LG BL20T
- LG BL20v
- LG BL40
- LG BL40e
- LG BL40f
- LG BL40g
- LG BL42k

=== BP series ===
- LG BP3200
- LG BP4270
- LG BP5000
- LG BP5550
- LG BP6100

=== BX series ===
- LG BX4170
- LG BX5450
- LG BX6170
- LG BX7000

=== C series ===
- LG C1100
- LG C1100GO
- LG C1150
- LG C1200
- LG C1300
- LG C1300i
- LG C1400
- LG C1500
- LG C2000
- LG C2100
- LG C2200
- LG C2200GO
- LG C3100
- LG C3300
- LG C3300GO
- LG C3310
- LG C3310GO
- LG C3320
- LG C3320GO
- LG C3380
- LG C3400
- LG C3600
- LG C100
- LG C105
- LG C193
- LG C195
- LG C195N
- LG C199
- LG C205
- LG C258
- LG C260
- LG C270
- LG C280
- LG C290
- LG C300
- LG C300GO
- LG C305
- LG C305N
- LG C310
- LG C320
- LG C320I
- LG C330
- LG C330I
- LG C333
- LG C360
- LG C365
- LG C370
- LG C375
- LG C395
- LG C397
- LG C399
- LG C410
- LG C440
- LG C550
- LG C555
- LG C570F
- LG C570G
- LG C600
- LG C610
- LG C620
- LG C630
- LG C636
- LG C650
- LG C660
- LG C660H
- LG C660R
- LG C670
- LG C676
- LG C680
- LG C686
- LG C710H
- LG C729DW
- LG C800DG
- LG C800G
- LG C810
- LG C820
- LG C900
- LG C900B
- LG C900K
- LG C910
- LG C930
- LG C950
- LG C960

=== CB series ===
- LG CB630

=== CD series ===
- LG CD02
- LG CD3000
- LG CD3600
- LG CD6100

=== CE series ===
- LG CE110
- LG CE500
- LG CE0168

=== CF series ===
- LG CF360
- LG CF360GO
- LG CF360GO1
- LG CF750

=== CG series ===
- LG CG180
- LG CG225
- LG CG300

=== CM series ===
- LG CM101

=== CP series ===
- LG CP150

=== CT series ===
- LG CT100
- LG CT810
- LG CT815

=== CU series ===
- LG CU320
- LG CU400
- LG CU405
- LG CU500
- LG CU500V
- LG CU500v
- LG CU515
- LG CU515R
- LG CU575
- LG CU6060
- LG CU6160
- LG CU6260
- LG CU6360
- LG CU6760
- LG CU720
- LG CU8080
- LG CU8180
- LG CU8188
- LG CU8280
- LG CU8380
- LG CU915
- LG CU920

=== CX series ===
- LG CX1000
- LG CX10000B
- LG CX10000BW
- LG CX10000T
- LG CX125
- LG CX150
- LG CX150B
- LG CX150V
- LG CX160P
- LG CX160V
- LG CX200
- LG CX210
- LG CX230S
- LG CX230V
- LG CX231
- LG CX231P
- LG CX245
- LG CX260
- LG CX260B
- LG CX260P
- LG CX260S
- LG CX260V
- LG CX265
- LG CX265B
- LG CX265P
- LG CX265S
- LG CX265T
- LG CX265V
- LG CX265X
- LG CX280
- LG CX280B
- LG CX285
- LG CX3200
- LG CX325
- LG CX325B
- LG CX3300
- LG CX3300B
- LG CX3300V
- LG CX380
- LG CX385
- LG CX385B
- LG CX400K
- LG CX4600
- LG CX4750
- LG CX490
- LG CX500K
- LG CX535
- LG CX5400
- LG CX5400B
- LG CX5400S
- LG CX5450
- LG CX550
- LG CX5500
- LG CX5500X
- LG CX550B
- LG CX5550
- LG CX570
- LG CX570V
- LG CX600
- LG CX600B
- LG CX600K
- LG CX6070
- LG CX6100
- LG CX6200
- LG CX6200B
- LG CX670
- LG CX700
- LG CX700B
- LG CX700K
- LG CX700V
- LG CX7100
- LG CX7100X
- LG CX800
- LG CX800B
- LG CX8100
- LG CX830
- LG CX830B
- LG CX8500
- LG CX8550
- LG CX8560
- LG CX8600
- LG CX8700B
- LG CX8700BW
- LG CX8700T
- LG CX8700X
- LG CX8800
- LG CX9100
- LG CX9100X
- LG CX9200
- LG CX9600
- LG CX9700

=== D series ===
- LG D280N
- LG D290N
- LG D295 (Dual Sim)

=== F series ===
- LG F1200
- LG F2100
- LG F2200
- LG F2250
- LG F2300
- LG F2400
- LG F3000
- LG F7200
- LG F7250
- LG F9100
- LG F9200
- LG F400L

=== G series ===
- LG G1100
- LG G1500
- LG G1610
- LG G1700
- LG G1800
- LG G3000
- LG G3100
- LG G4011
- LG G4015
- LG G4020
- LG G4050
- LG G5220C
- LG G5300
- LG G5300I
- LG G5310
- LG G5400
- LG G5450
- LG G5500
- LG G5600
- LG G6070
- LG G7000
- LG G7020
- LG G7030
- LG G7050
- LG G7070
- LG G7100
- LG G7120
- LG G7200
- LG G8000
- LG G210
- LG G510
- LG G510W
- LG G650
- LG G912

=== GB series ===
- LG GB102
- LG GB106
- LG GB108
- LG GB109
- LG GB110
- LG GB115
- LG GB125
- LG GB130
- LG GB170
- LG GB190
- LG GB210
- LG GB220
- LG GB230
- LG GB250
- LG GB270
- LG GB280

=== LU series ===
- LG LU1600
- LG LU2300
- LG LU3000
- LG LU3100
- LG LU3700
- LG LU4400
- LG LU4500
- LG LU6300
- LG LU640
- LG LU9000
- LG LU9100
- LG LU930
- LG LU9400
- LG LU9400W
- LG LU6200

=== M series ===
- LG M4300
- LG M4330
- LG M4410
- LG M6100
- LG MG110
- LG MG150
- LG MG155c
- LG MG160
- LG MG165
- LG MX7000

=== P series ===
- LG P350
- LG P500
- LG P500H
- LG P503
- LG P506
- LG P525
- LG P880
- LG P970
- LG P999
- LG P7200

=== S series ===
- LG S5300

=== SU Series ===
- LG SU370
- LG SU620

=== T series ===
- LG T300 Cookie Lite
- LG T310 Cookie/Wink Style
- LG T310i Cookie Wi-Fi
- LG T315i
- LG T320 Cookie 3G
- LG T370 Cookie Smart
- LG T375 Cookie Smart
- LG T385 "New Cookie"
- LG T580

=== V series ===
- LG V905R
- LG V900
- LG V960
- LG VS990

=== W Series ===
- LG W41
- LG W41+
- LG W41 Pro
- LG W31
- LG W31+
- LG W11

=== X series ===
- LG X Venture
- LG X Charge
- LG X Power
- LG X Style
- LG X Cam
- LG X Screen
- LG X Mach

=== LG Stylo Series ===
- LG Stylo 2
- LG Stylo 3 Plus
- LG Stylo 4
- LG Stylo 5
- LG Stylo 6
- LG G Stylo

== See also ==
- LG Cyon
- GU230
- LG Xenon

== More ==
- LG K3
- LG Venice
- LG Optimus Dynamic 2
- LG Optimus V
- LG Logos
- LG G3
- LG Google Nexus 5
- LG K20+
- LG Google Nexus 4
- LG Sunset
- LG Stylo 2
- LG K30
- LG Risio
- LG Optimus Fuel
- LG VN251S (Cosmos 3)
- LG 305C
- LG 840G
- LG LX160
- LG LX260 (Rumor)
- LG Exalt
- LG VN250 (Cosmos)
- LG VX8550 (Chocolate 2)
- LG 200C
- LG PM225
- LG VM101
- LG VX9700 (Dare)
- LG UX210
- LG VX8300
- LG VX9200 (enV3)
- LG UX830
- LG 440G
- LG LX600 (Lotus)
- LG VN150 (Revere)
- LG 441G
- LG 306G
- LG 1010
- LG VN170 (Revere 3)
- LG C1300i
- LG LX550 (Fusic)
- LG VX9900 (enV)
- LG 329G
- LG UX265 (Banter)
