= LG Fiesta =

Android smartphone

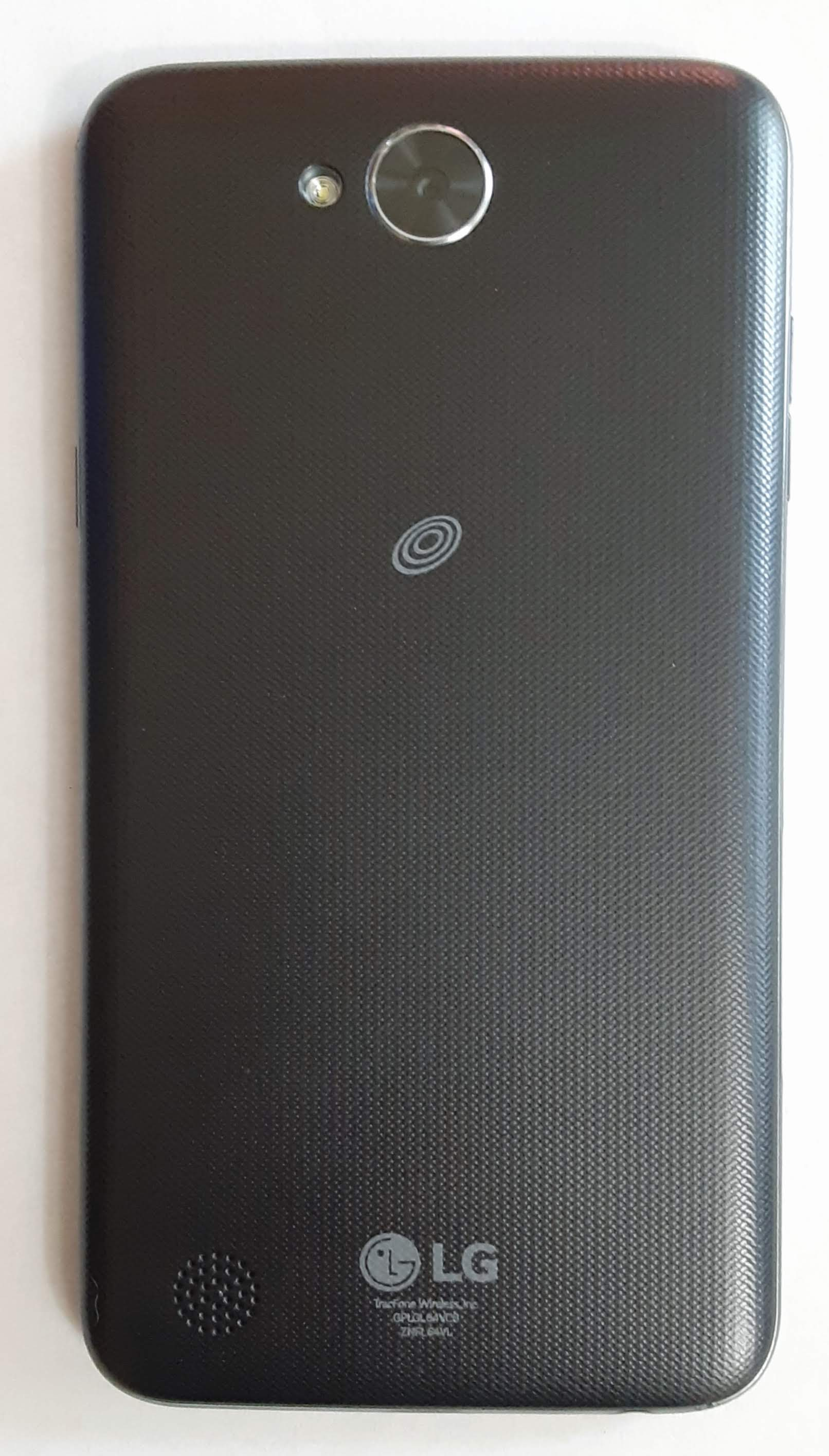
- LG Fiesta from TracFone Wireless
- Brand: LG
- Manufacturer: LG Electronics
- Type: Touchscreen Smartphone
- First released: July 2017
- Successor: LG Fiesta 2
- Dimensions: 154.7 x 77.97 x 8.4 mm (6.17 x 3.04 x 0.27 in)
- Weight: 164 g (6 oz)
- Operating system: Android 7.0 Nougat
- CPU: 1.4 GHz Quad core
- GPU: Adreno 308
- Memory: 1.5GB RAM
- Storage: 16GB
- Removable storage: microSD, up to 2TB
- Battery: Li-Ion 4500 mAh (Non-Removable)
- Rear camera: 13 MP
- Front camera: 5 MP
- Display: 5.5 in
- Website: www.lg.com/us/cell-phones/lg-L63BL-fiesta

The LG Fiesta is an Android smartphone developed by LG Electronics that was launched in 2017. The phone has 16 GB of internal storage and 1.5 GB of RAM. It is equipped with a 4500 mAh battery and a forward facing flash.

== Specifications ==
=== Hardware ===
The LG Fiesta is equipped with Android 7 Nougat. It has a 1.4 GHz Quad core and an Adreno 308 GPU. It has 16 GB of internal storage, which can be expanded with a microSD card, up to 2 TB, and 1.5 GB of RAM. It comes with a 13 MP rear facing and 5 MP front-facing camera, along with a front and back flash.

== History ==
The phone was released in July 2017.

== See also ==
- LG Electronics
- List of LG mobile phones
- Android
