= LG Arena =

LG Arena may refer to:

- LG Arena (KM900), an LG Electronics multimedia phone
- LG Arena (Birmingham), a former name of the Resorts World Arena, a multi-purpose arena in Birmingham, United Kingdom
