= LG Xenon (GR500) =

LG mobile phone released in 2009

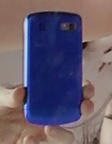
- Manufacturer: LG Electronics
- Compatible networks: UMTS / HSDPA / EDGE / GPRS GSM 850 / 900 / 1800 / 1900
- Form factor: Slider, Touch
- Dimensions: 4.16×2.11×0.62 in (106×54×16 mm)
- Weight: 3.81 oz (108 g)
- Operating system: Proprietary
- Removable storage: microSD card ( holds up to a 16gb)
- Battery: 950 mAh; 4 hours talk time 11 days stand by
- Rear camera: 2.0 megapixels Flash
- Display: 240 x 400 pixels 262k colors
- External display: 2.8 inches

The LG GR500 (LG Xenon) is a mobile phone manufactured by LG Electronics, which features a touch screen and QWERTY keyboard on AT&T's 3G network. It was released April, 2009, compared to 2007 for the first iPhone and 2008 for the first Android phone. It offers a flash for the 2.0 mega pixel camera, GPS, multi tasking, a menu or favorite contacts, and a microSD slot for music, pictures, and video. Voice dialing and video share are among the features on this phone. Newer models of the phone also include a front-facing camera for video chat, that is incapable of recording video or pictures. The LG Xenon does not have Wi-Fi capability.

== Design ==
The LG Xenon comes in black, blue, red, and purple. It runs on an OS similar to its predecessor the LG Vu, and has a slide out QWERTY keyboard and resistive touch screen. Its keyboard has dedicated buttons for text and email messages. When opened, the phone is viewed in a wider aspect than when closed. A lock button on the right side allows the phone to be used while it is not open. The default themes are white with blue outlining, and black with red outlining.

== In popular culture ==
In the 2011 romantic comedy Crazy, Stupid, Love, extreme close-ups of Robbie Weaver's blue LG Xenon in horizontal mode are repeatedly used to show him sending text messages to his crush.

== See also ==
- List of LG mobile phones
- LG Electronics
- LG Shine
- LG Vu
- AT&T
- Samsung Eternity, a competitor.
- Samsung Impression, a competitor.
