= Wireless conference system =

Economics & Management

A wireless conference system is communications device for a conference system in which communication between the individual conference units and the system control unit are connected wirelessly. These may be simple POTS or VOIP speakerphone units or more complex units which can identify the person speaking or record a conference member's vote.

These systems are generally used by businesses and professional organizations for conferences or meetings.

== Development history ==
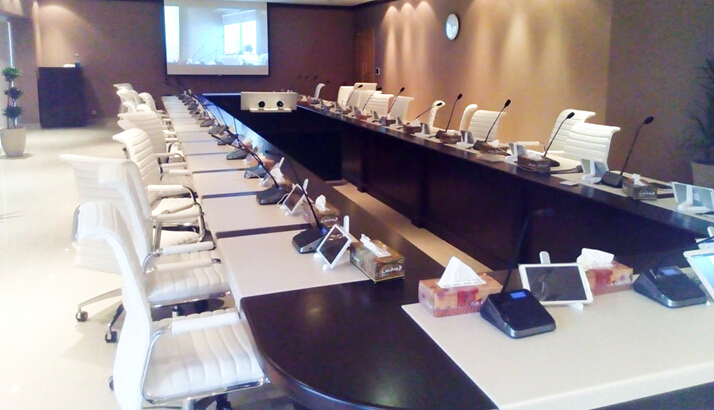
2021 wireless paperless conference system

The wireless communication system first used a digital modulating signal based on infrared ray, which is evolved from IR interpretation system. Secondly, the technique applied in wireless conference system is 2.4 GHz modulating signal, which support more stable communication and avoid environment interference caused by buildings, sun lights and others.

As more digital appliances based 2.4 GHz frequency band, it could be easy to interfere with the communication of 2.4G wireless conference system. Consequently, 5.8 GHz frequency band is applied in some wireless conference systems. In some cases, there are dual-band conference system that could change the communication frequency band in according to the usage of the frequency points. They are also susceptible to less interference than 2.4 GHz phones, but Wi-Fi networks in the faster 8.02.11n standard do interfere with 5.8 GHz.
