= LG VX5500 =

Mobile phone model

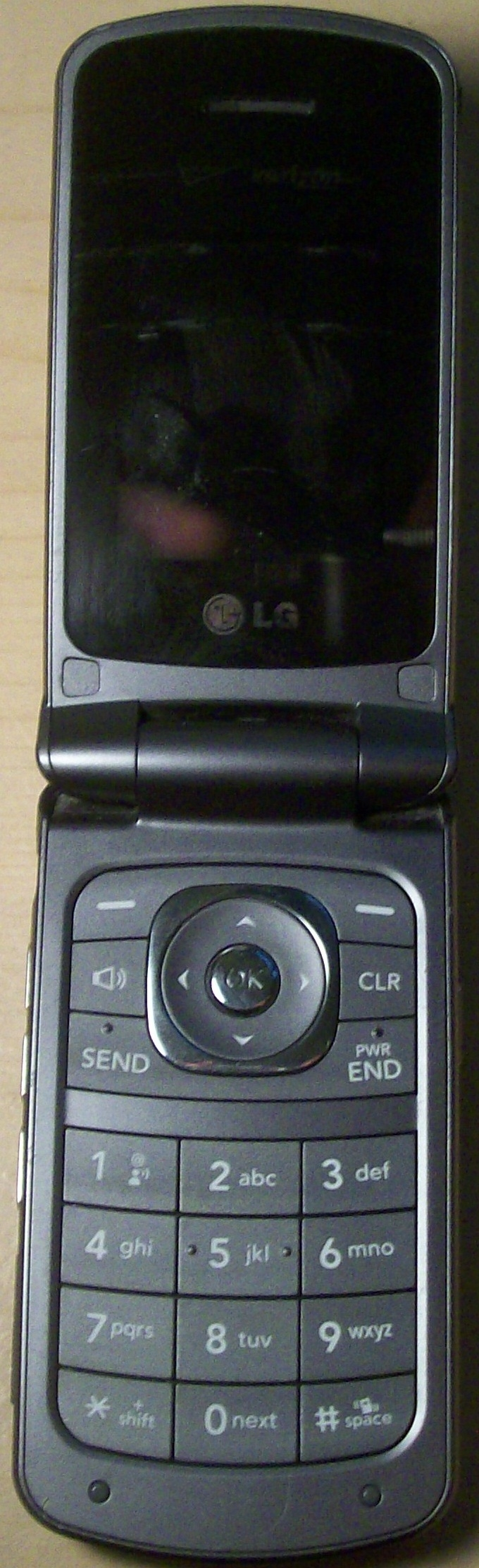
An LG VX5500 phone

The LG VX5500 is a mobile phone used by Verizon Wireless. The phone was released on October 31, 2008, by LG. It is also used on Virgin Mobile. The phone contains the following features:

- VGA camera
- Bluetooth
- TYY capable
- keypad for quick dialing
- Front screen
- Media Center
- VZ Navigator

== Carriers ==
- Verizon Wireless
- AT&T
- T-Mobile
- Cricket Wireless

== Specifications ==
- WAP/ Web Browser - Yes
- Text Messaging - Yes
- Picture Messaging - Yes
- Video Messaging - Yes
- Games - Yes
- Camera - VGA Camera
- Video Capture - Yes
- Voice Memo - Yes
- Application Download - Via Media Center
- Voicemail - Yes

== See also ==
- List of LG mobile phones
- LG VX8300
