= LG Optimus Chic =

Android smartphone manufactured by LG Electronics

LG Optimus Chic E720
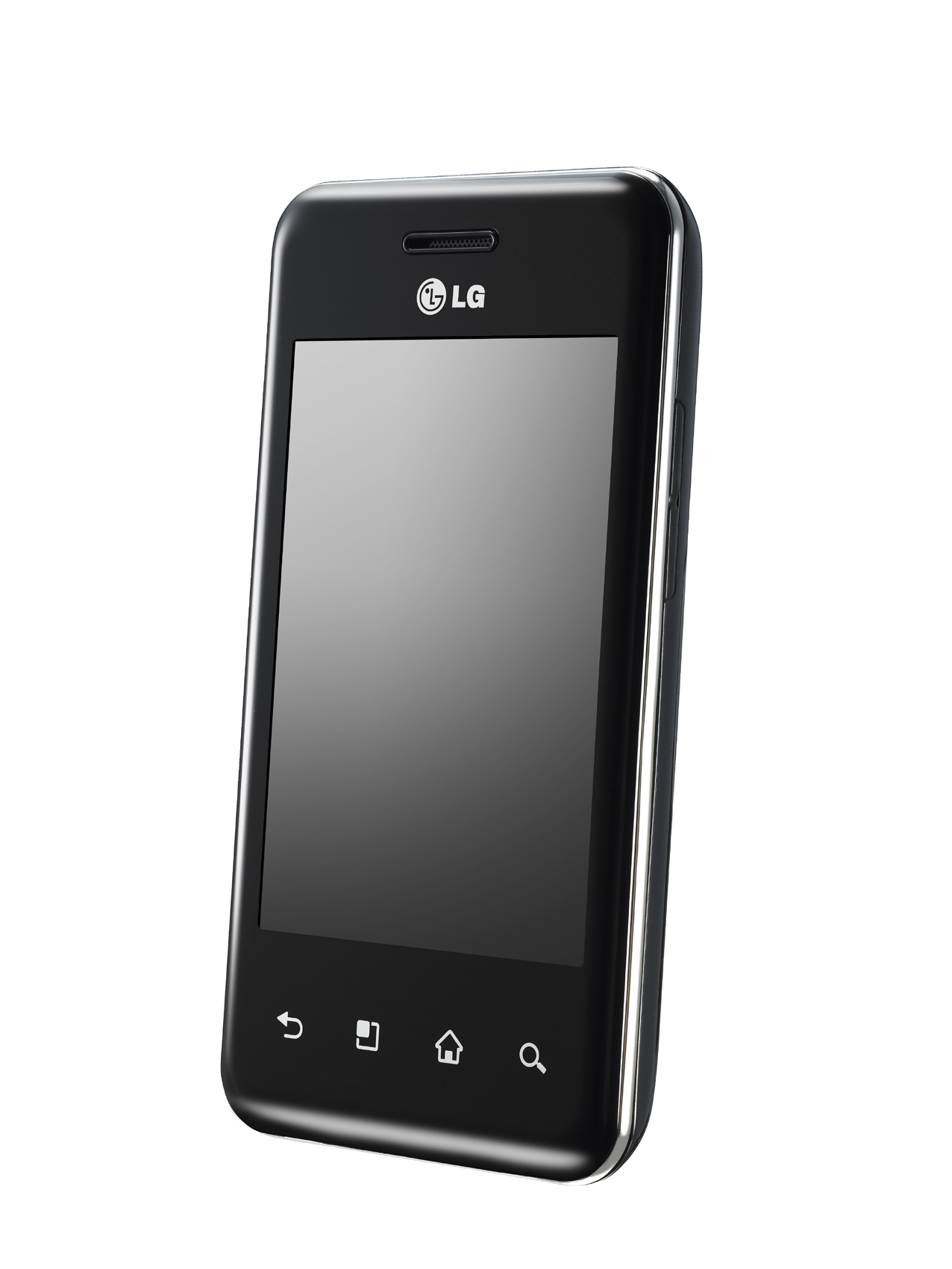
- LG Optimus Chic E720 front
- Brand: LG
- Manufacturer: LG Electronics, Inc.
- Series: Optimus
- Availability by region: November 2010
- Related: LG GT540 Optimus, LG Optimus One P500
- Compatible networks: GSM/GPRS/EDGE Quad-band (850/900/1800/1900); UMTS/HSPA tri-band (900/1700/2100); HSDPA 7.2 Mbit/s; GPRS Class 10 (4+1/3+2 slots), 32-48 kbit/s CDMA EVDO Rev. A (800/1900-Global Variant ,1800(1.8 GHz Korean Pcs)-South Korea LG U+ Variant)
- Form factor: Slate
- Operating system: Android 2.2 Froyo
- CPU: GSM 600 MHz Qualcomm MSM7227 ARM1136EJ-S
- GPU: Qualcomm Adreno 200
- Memory: 512 MB SDRAM
- Storage: 512 MB ROM (180-190 MB user addressable)
- Removable storage: 2 GB microSD (supports up to 32 GB)
- Battery: LGIP-401N; 1,250 mAh, 4.7 Wh, 3.7 V Internal Rechargeable Li-ion; User replaceable
- Rear camera: VGA video recording (640×480 px, MPEG4 at 30 fps max.); Auto-focus; 5-megapixels
- Display: TFT LCD, 3.2 in (81 mm) diagonal 320×480 px HVGA @ 180 ppi 2:3 aspect-ratio wide-screen 256K colors
- Connectivity: 3.5 mm TRRS; Bluetooth 2.1 + EDR with A2DP; FM stereo receiver (87.5-108 MHz) with RDS (certain variants); Micro USB 2.0; Wi-Fi 802.11b/g
- Data inputs: Multi-touch capacitive touchscreen A-GPS; S-GPS; Accelerometer; Microphone; Proximity sensor Push buttons
- Other: Wi-Fi hotspot, USB tethering

The LG Optimus Chic E720 is an entry-level, touch-screen smartphone manufactured by LG Electronics, Inc.

== See also ==
- Galaxy Nexus
