= LG Viewty Smart (GC900) =

Mobile phone manufactured by LG Electronics

LG-GC900 (LG Viewty Smart)
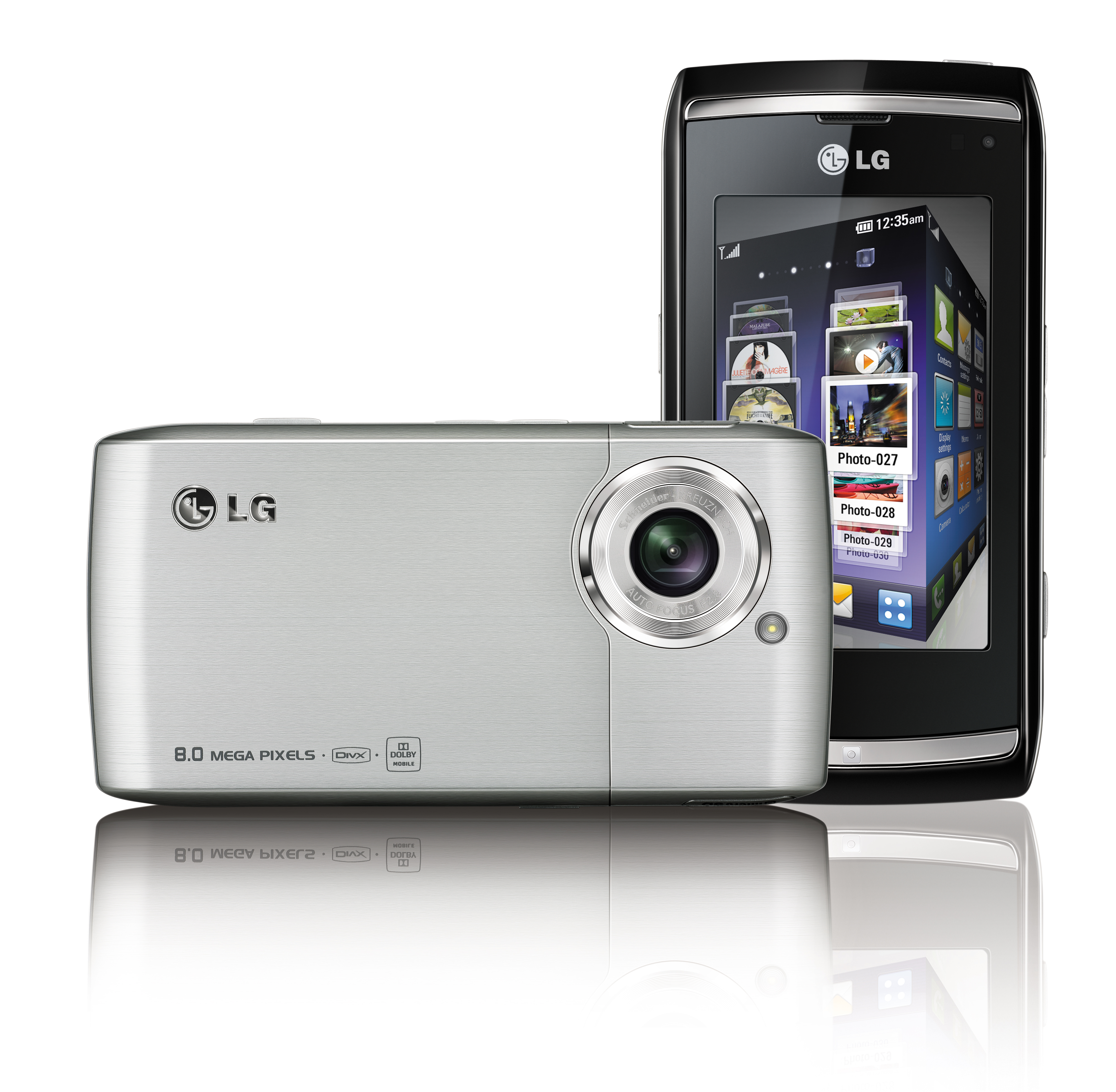
- Manufacturer: LG Electronics
- Availability by region: 2009
- Compatible networks: HSDPA, GSM, GPRS
- Form factor: Candybar
- Dimensions: 56.1 x 108.9 x 12.4 (W x L x D)
- Weight: 102 g (4 oz)
- Memory: 1.5 GB
- Removable storage: MicroSD
- Rear camera: 8.0 megapixel, video 30 frame/s or slow-motion video 120 frame/s, Strobe Flash
- Front camera: VGA Video call (Front)
- Display: TFT, touchscreen, 3", 480x800 (WVGA)
- Connectivity: Bluetooth 2.1, USB 2.0, Wi-Fi

The LG-GC900 (known and marketed as the LG Viewty Smart) is a mobile phone manufactured by LG Electronics. It was released in June 2009 as successor to the LG Viewty (KU990). It features the S-Class UI that was introduced on the LG Arena. The Viewty Smart succeeded the LG Viewty.

== Reception ==
CNET noted lag and omission when using the on-screen keyboard.
