= LG VS740 =

Smartphone

LG VS740 Ally, LG Apex, LG Axis
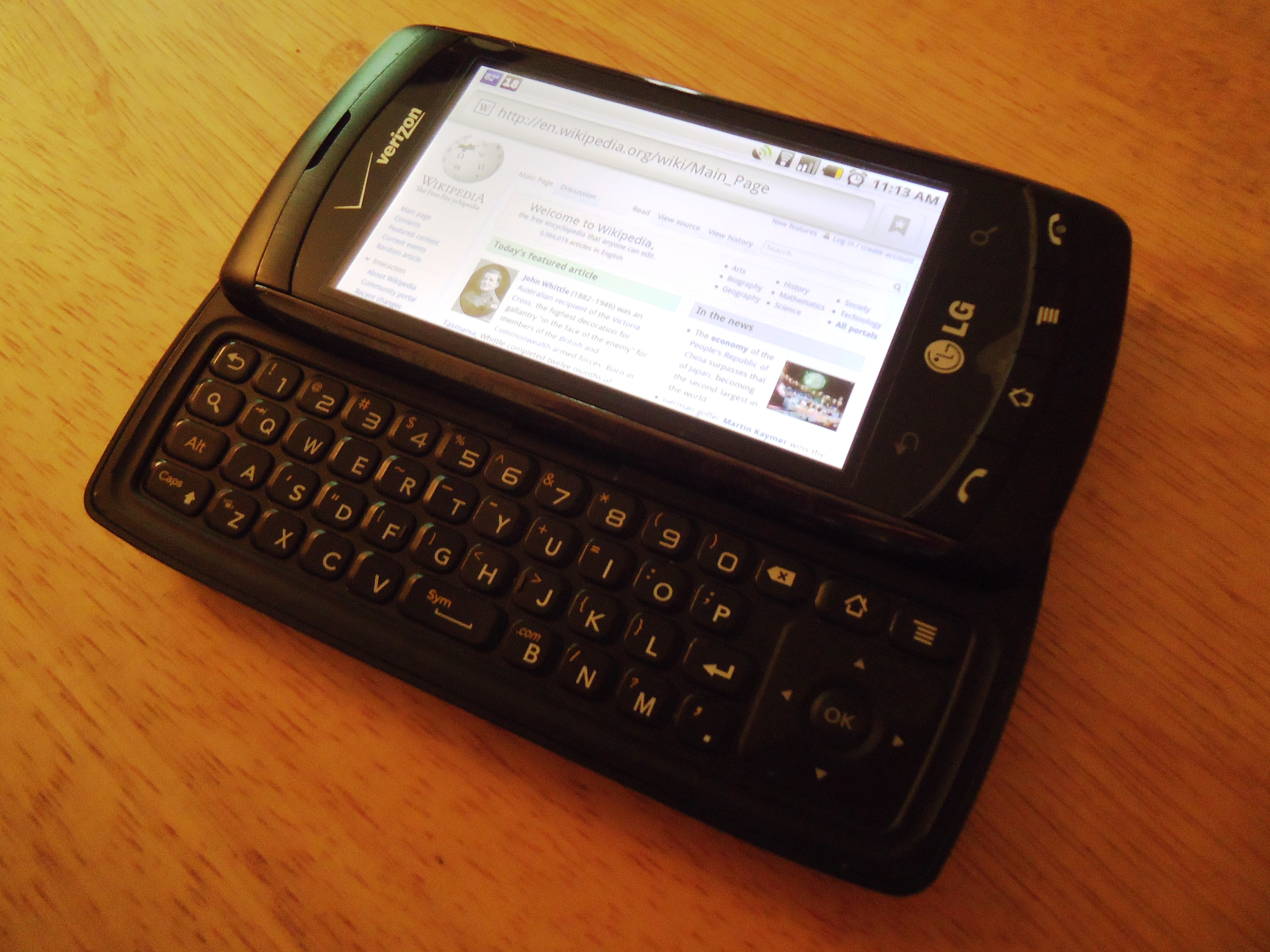
- Manufacturer: LG Electronics
- Type: Smartphone
- First released: April 2010 (United States)
- Discontinued: July 2011 Verizon Wireless version
- Related: LG Apex, LG Axis
- Dimensions: 4.56" x 2.22" x 0.62" (116mm x 56mm x 16mm)
- Weight: 5.57 oz (158 g)
- Operating system: Android 2.2 as of 20 January 2011, unofficially updatable to 2.3.4 Gingerbread
- CPU: 600 MHz Qualcomm MSM7627
- Memory: 256 MiB RAM, 512 MiB ROM
- Storage: 4 GB microSD card, pre-installed
- Battery: Removable 1,500 mAh battery, charged via Micro-USB (type B)
- Rear camera: 3.2-megapixel with video, LED flash and autofocus
- Display: 480 x 800 px Gorilla Glass
- Media: Built-in MP3 player, 3.5mm headset jack, Bluetooth A2DP compatibility
- Connectivity: Wi-Fi (802.11b/g/n), Bluetooth 2.1+EDR, Micro-USB (B), A-GPS (gpsOne), 800/1900 MHz CDMA, EVDO Rev A
- Data inputs: Multi-touch capacitive touchscreen display, QWERTY keyboard
- Hearing aid compatibility: M4/T3

The LG VS740 (LG Ally, LG Apex, LG Axis) is a mid-range smartphone manufactured by LG Electronics.

The Ally features a 480x800 LCD capacitive touchscreen display and a 3.2-megapixel camera with flash. It runs Android 2.1 with an update to Android 2.2, and has LG customizations, including a Themes application allowing the Ally to run LG's own launcher, similar to HTC Sense, Motoblur, and TouchWiz, although it is optional by default; and LG widgets including the Socialite application, which aggregates Facebook and Twitter. It also features a four-row slider keyboard with a d-pad.

It has a hearing-aid compatibility (HAC) rating of M4/T3.

== Variants ==
=== US740 ===
The LG Apex (US740) is a modified version of the LG Ally for US Cellular. It is identical to the Ally, except for a redesigned front.

=== AS740 ===
The LG Axis (LGAS740) is an identical generic version of the LG Apex that is available through various regional carriers in the United States including Cellular South, Cox Wireless, and Bluegrass Wireless.

=== LG Shine Plus ===
The LG Shine Plus is a modified version of the Aloha rebranded for the Telus carrier in Canada. While visually similar, its model number is LG C710 and is internally known as the Aloha Global board, or alohag. The most significant change from the Ally, this phone uses the MSM 7227 cpu, and is quad band GSM/HSDPA. The phone features a 5.0 MP camera and increased memory compared to the Ally. It was originally released with Android 2.1, but has received an official update to 2.3.3.

== Updates ==
On Verizon US, the following updates have been issued (dates may vary based on when the over-the-air update was received):

- 23 September 2010: a firmware upgrade (to 2.1-update1) and a software upgrade (to VS740ZV8)
- 24 November 2010: a software upgrade (to VS740ZVC)
- 20 January 2011: a firmware upgrade to 2.2 (to VS740ZVD)
- 28 April 2011: a firmware upgrade to 2.2.2* (to VS740ZVE) (This upgrade required Ally owners to install an application called Update Utility for Ally from the Android Market. Ally owners received a TXT message notification about a week before the upgrade was officially available). This is a modified Android version and not the full FroYo (no Adobe Flash, but does allow APPS2SD).

== See also ==
- Galaxy Nexus
- List of Android devices
