= LG VX3400 =

Flip phone manufacutured by LG

LG VX-3400
- Brand: LG
- Manufacturer: LG Electronics
- Availability by region: United States September 2006 (Verizon)
- Compatible networks: AMPS 800 MHz; CDMA 800/1900 MHz
- Form factor: Clamshell
- Dimensions: 3.33 in × 1.79 in × 0.94 in (85 mm × 45 mm × 24 mm)
- Weight: 3.00 oz (85 g)
- Battery: 1100 mAh Li-Ion
- Display: 128 x 128 pixels, STN LCD, 65,536 colors
- External display: 96 x 64 pixels, STN LCD
- Sound: 32-voice polyphonic ringtones, 2.5 mm headset jack
- Connectivity: USB, GPS
- SAR: Head: 0.50 W/kg, Body: 0.33 W/kg

The LG VX3400 is a disontinued clamshell/flip phone manufactued and branded by LG Electronics. It was released in September 2006 for the Verizon Wireless carrier.

== Specifiations ==
=== Display & appearance ===
The VX3400 is housed by a 128×128-pixel STN display with 65,536 colors and an 1-inch external display of 96 by 64 pixels. The mobile phone was measured at 3.33 inches of height, 1.79 of width and 0.94 of thickness. The VX3400 has a dark blue with gray accents.

=== Features ===
The VX3400 supports vibrate mode, text and picture messaging, a schedule, an alarm clock, voice memo recording, a notepad, a calculator and a tip calcuator as well, a world clock, a unit converter, and a melody composer for composing a ringtone.

== See also ==
- List of LG mobile phones
