= LG VX8300 =

Mobile phone model

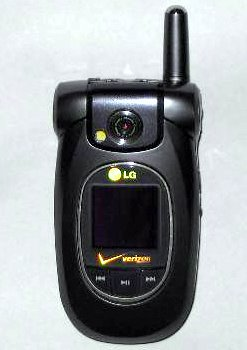
- Predecessor: LG VX8100
- Successor: LG VX8350
- Compatible networks: CDMA 850 and 1900
- Dimensions: 3.58" × 1.93" × 0.92" (91 × 49 × 23 mm)
- Weight: 3.88 oz (110 g)
- Memory: 28 MB, expandable
- Display: 176×220 pixels, 262,000 colors
- Connectivity: Bluetooth, USB
- Hearing aid compatibility: M3

The LG VX8300 was one of Verizon's most popular mobile phones. This phone contains the following features:

- 1.3 megapixel camera with LED flash and self-portrait capability
- Video capture and playback (3GP) up to size of available memory
- TFT LCD with 176×220 pixels supporting 262,000 colors.
- Integrated MP3 player
- Stereo speakers integrated into the clamshell hinge
- Expandability via MicroSD memory cards up to 2GB in size
- Office quality speakerphone
- Speaker independent speech recognition with voice digit dialing
- High-Speed Data Technology: CDMA2000 1× and EV-DO
- GPS Localization using gpsOne

Other technical data include:

- Form Factor: Clamshell, Stub Antenna
- Battery Life: Talk: 3.83 hours (230 minutes), Standby: 384 hours (16 days)
- Extended 1700 mAh Battery available: 5.90 hours (354 minutes), Standby: 593 hours (24 days)
- Bluetooth: Supported Profiles: HSP, HFP, OPP (for vCard), DUN, A2DP, AVRC version 1.1 / supports stereo
- 2.5 mm jack
- MP3 player does not support variable bit-rate, good working "Fast Forward" feature
- This is the last LG phone model capable of assigning ringtones for "No caller ID" and "Restricted Calls"

== Carriers ==
- Verizon Wireless
- Page Plus Cellular

== LG VX8300 Specifications ==
The complete LG VX8300 list of specifications are:

Type	Specification
Modes	CDMA 850 / CDMA 1900
Weight	3.88 oz (110 g)
Dimensions	3.58" × 1.93" × 0.92" (91 × 49 × 23 mm)
Form Factor	Clamshell Stub Antenna
Battery Life	Talk: 3.83 hours (230 minutes) Standby: 384 hours (16 days)
Battery Type	LiIon 1100 mAh
Display	Type: LCD (Color TFT/TFD) Colors: 262,144 (18-bit) Size: 176 x 220 pixels
Platform / OS	BREW with Flash-based Verizon UI
Memory	28 MB (built-in, flash shared memory)
Phone Book Capacity	500
FCC ID	BEJVX8300 (Approved Mar 3, 2006)
GPS / Location	Simultaneous GPS
Digital TTY/TDD	Yes
Hearing Aid Compatible	Rating: M3 (mostly compatible)
Multiple Languages	Languages Supported: English, Spanish
External Display	Location: Front 65,000-color OLED / 96 x 96 pixels
Polyphonic Ringtones	Chords: 72
Vibrate	Yes
Bluetooth	Supported Profiles: HSP, HFP, OPP (only for vCard), DUN, A2DP, AVRC version 1.1 / supports stereo
USB	Yes
Multiple Numbers per Name	Numbers per entry: 5 plus 2 email addresses
Picture ID	Yes
Ringer ID	Yes
Voice Dialing	speaker-independent
Custom Graphics	Yes
Custom Ringtones	recordable voice ringtones
Data-Capable	Yes
Packet Data	Technology: 1xRTT and EV-DO r0 hybrid
WAP / Web Browser	Yes
Predictive Text Entry	Technology: T9
Side Keys	volume, voice keys on left / camera key on right
Memory Card Slot	Card Type: microSD (Up to 2 GB) / TransFlash (Up to 4 GB)
MMS	Yes
Text Messaging	2-Way: Yes
Text Messaging Templates	Yes
Music Player	Supported Formats: WMA, MP3
Stereo Speakers	Yes
Camera	Resolution: 1.3-megapixel LED flash / self-timer, night mode / brightness, white balance controls
Streaming Video	Yes
Video Capture	Max. Length: up to memory limit QCIF resolution (176 x 144 pixels)
Alarm	3 Alarms. Modes: Once, Daily, Mo-Fr. Alarm sounds for 15 minutes
Calculator	with unit converter, tip calculator
Calendar	Yes
Voice Memo	Yes
BREW	Yes
Games	Yes
Headset Jack (2.5 mm)	Yes
Speaker Phone	Type: Full-Duplex

== Reception ==
Sascha Segan of PC Magazine gave it 4 out of 5 dots stating that the LG VX8300 was "An all-around solid choice for Verizon that will get better as currently disabled features are added with time."
