= LG Versa =

Mobile phone model

LG Versa (VX9600)
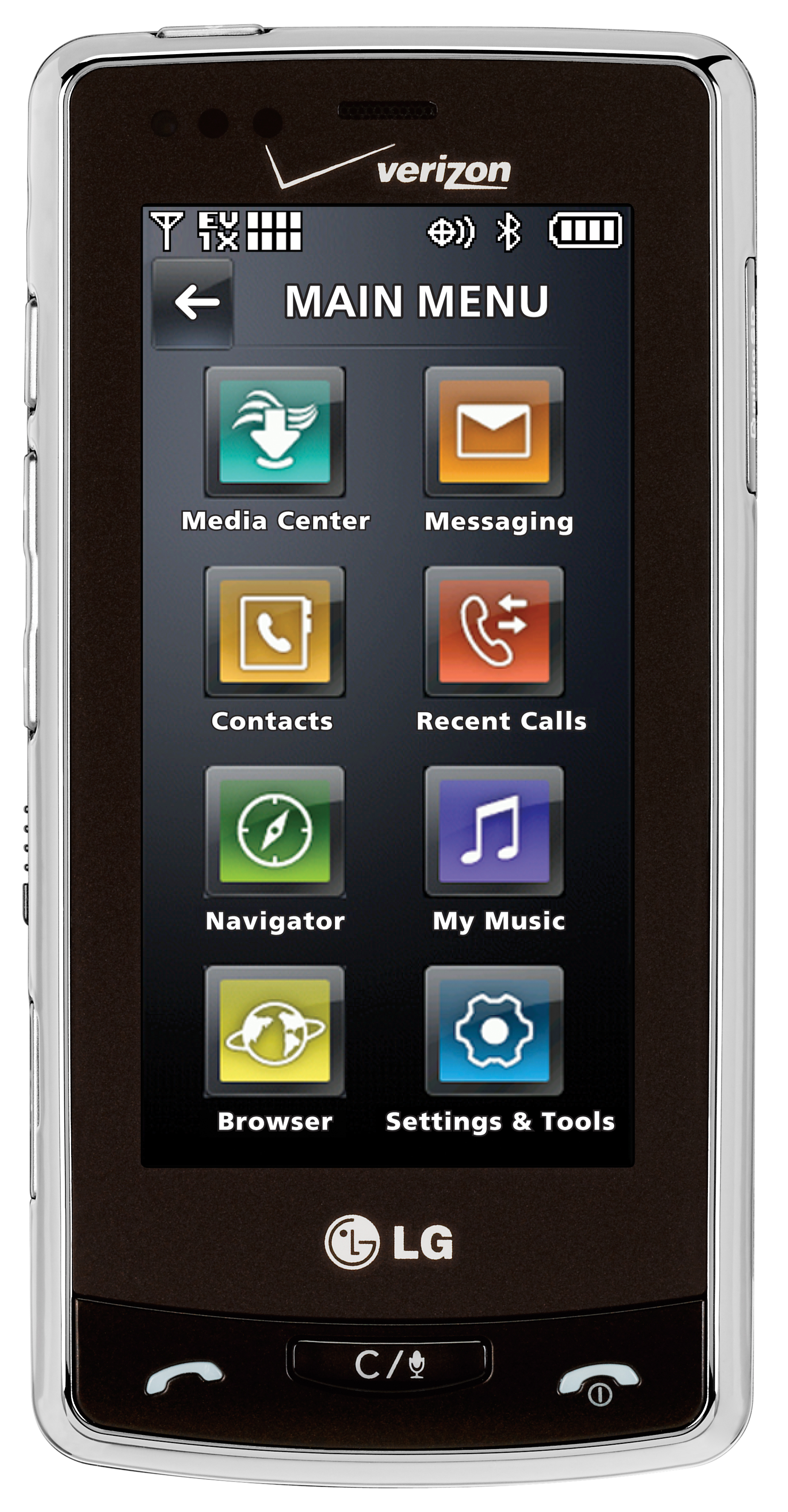
- Manufacturer: LG Electronics
- Availability by region: September 9, 2009
- Compatible networks: EVDO, 1XRTT
- Form factor: Clamshell (Candybar/flip)
- Dimensions: 4.16×2.07×0.54 in (106×53×14 mm)
- Weight: 140g (4.92 oz)
- Operating system: BREW
- CPU: Qualcomm MSM7500A 528MHz ARM1136EJ-S
- Memory: 310 MB
- Removable storage: up to 16 GB (microSD)
- Battery: Li – Ion, 1100 mAH
- Rear camera: 2.0-megapixel
- Display: LCD 240 x 480
- Connectivity: Bluetooth / Micro USB Cable / 2.5mm Audio Jack
- Data inputs: touch QWERTY onscreen keyboard or detachable QWERTY keyboard, handwriting recognition, alphanumeric keypad
- Hearing aid compatibility: M4/T4

The LG Versa (VX9600) is a mobile phone for use on the Verizon Wireless network. Like the LG Dare VX-9700, the Versa has a full touch screen and onscreen QWERTY keyboard. The Versa also accepts handwriting recognition or gesture control for entering phone numbers and typing. The phone includes a HTML mobile web web browser, a built-in MP3 music player, access to Verizon Wireless's VCAST multimedia services, and mobile e-mail services. The phone includes a 2.0-mp digital camera with zoom, autofocus, and flash. The phone also had a built-in camcorder. An expandable MicroSD card slot is included into the phone, though no MicroSD card is pre-installed into the device. The difference between the LG Dare and the Versa is that the Versa featured a unique, foldout QWERTY keyboard that was detachable. Originally included with the Versa, the QWERTY keyboard was no longer included and only available as an accessory at Verizon Wireless retail stores. The attachment also included send and end call keys so that the user could answer an incoming call even with the flip closed. The attachment also included an integrated LED display screen that displayed information such as the currently-playing music track, current time, current date, signal strength, type of CDMA signal (1X or 3G) that the phone was currently operating on, the network provider's name, and who is calling, should an incoming call come through when the case is attached and closed.

== Features ==
- Network
  - Type: CDMA Dual Band (800 / 1900 MHz)
  - Data: CDMA 2000 1xRTT / 1xEV-DO Rev.0 / 1xEV-DO Rev.A
  - 3G Capable: Yes
- Size
  - Dimensions: 4.16 x 2.07 x 0.54 inches
  - Weight: 3.81 oz
- Battery
  - Type: Li – Ion, 1100 mAH
  - Talk: 4.83 Hours (290 Minutes)
  - Standby: 430 Hours (18 Days)
- Main Display
  - Resolution: 240 x 480 Pixels
  - Type: 262,144 TFT
  - Physical Size: 3.00 Inches
  - Features: Light Sensor
  - Touch Screen: Yes With Hand Writing Recognition
- Additional Display
  - Resolution: 120 x 56 Pixels
  - Type: Monochrome OLED
  - Features: Only Available On The QWERTY Keypad Attachment
- Camera
  - Resolution: 2.0 Megapixels
  - Video Capture: Yes
  - Features: Auto focus, Flash (LED), Digital Zoom, White balance, Effects, Panorama
- Multimedia
  - Video Playback: MPEG 4, 3GP, 3GP2, WMV
  - Music Player: MP3, AAC, ACC+, WMA
- Memory
  - Memory Slot: Micro SD/Micro SDHC
  - Built In: 310 MB
- Input
  - Keypad: Detachable
- Connectivity
  - USB: Micro USB
  - Bluetooth: Version 2.1, Stereo Bluetooth
  - Connectors: Headset Jack (2.5mm)
