= LG VX9400 =

Mobile phone model

- Compatible networks: CDMA (EV-DO); 800/1900 MHz
- Dimensions: 4.04 in × 1.93 in × 0.75 in (103 mm × 49 mm × 19 mm)
- Weight: 4.06 oz (115 g)
- Memory: 38 MB
- Battery: Li-polymer, 950 mAh
- Rear camera: 1280 x 960 px
- Display: LCD 240 x 320 Pixels (262,144 colors)
- Connectivity: Bluetooth / USB Cable

The LG VX9400 is a mobile phone manufactured by LG Electronics. The CDMA radio is supplied by Verizon Wireless in the United States. It was one of the first two phones on the market to support live mobile TV broadcasts using Qualcomm's MediaFLO technology (along with the Samsung SCH-U620). The unique design of the QVGA display allows it to swing up into landscape orientation for TV viewing. Other key features of the VX9400 includes stereo Bluetooth, an SD card slot, digital music player, EVDO high-speed data connectivity, and speakerphone.

The phone was also featured in the 2008 movie Iron Man, as the phone Tony Stark used to communicate with Obadiah about the successful presentation of a Stark Industries Jericho missile. The phone was also a significant focus in the movie Picture This starring Ashley Tisdale. It is compatible with BitPim 1.0 and later to upload ringtones, transfer wallpapers and pictures, and to back up SMS messages, the phone book/contact list and the calendar. The current available software version is v03.

== Specifications/Features ==
| Modes: | CDMA 850 / CDMA 1900 |
| Weight: | 4.06 oz (115 g) |
| Dimensions: | 4.04 in × 1.93 in × 0.75 in (103 mm × 49 mm × 19 mm) |
| Form Factor: | Bar, with swing-up display |
| Antenna: | CDMA Internal; hidden extendible for Mobile TV |
| Battery Life (Talk): | 3.80 hours (228 minutes) |
| Battery Life (Standby): | 460 hours (19.2 days) |
| Battery Type: | Lithium Ion Polymer 950mAh |
| Display Type: | LCD (Color TFT/TFD) |
| Display Colors: | 262,144 (18-bit) |
| Display Resolution: | 240 x 320 pixels |
| Platform/OS: | None |
| Memory: | 38MB (Built-in Flash, shared) |
| Phone Book Capacity: | 500 entries (5 numbers, 2 e-mail addresses per entry) |
| FCC ID: | BEJVX9400 (Approved Sep 25, 2006) |
| GPS/Location Type: | A-GPS |
| Digital TTY/TDD: | Yes |
| Hearing Aid Compatibility Rating: | M4 (very compatible) |
| Available Languages: | English, Spanish |
| Polyphonic Ringtones: | Yes |
| Vibrate Alert: | Yes |
| Picture ID: | Yes |
| Ringtone ID: | Yes |
| Video ID: | Yes |
| Bluetooth: | Yes, Stereo |
| Supported Bluetooth Profiles: | HSP, HFP, DUN, OPP, FTP, BPP, A2DP, AVRC version 1.2 |
| USB: | Yes |
| Voice Dialing: | Yes, Speaker Independent |
| Custom Graphics: | Yes |
| Custom Ringtones: | Yes |
| Data-Capable: | Yes |
| Flight Mode: | Yes |
| Packet Data Technology: | 1xEV-DO r0 |
| WAP/Web Browser: | Openwave 6.2.3.2 (works in landscape mode only) |
| Predictive Text Entry: | T9 |
| Side Keys: | Voice, Volume (left); Camera, Speakerphone (right) |
| Memory Card Slot: | microSD (TransFlash) |
| Text Messaging: | Yes, 2-Way |
| MMS: | Yes |
| Text Message Templates: | Yes |
| Picture Messaging: | Yes |
| Video Messaging: | Yes |
| Digital Music/Audio Player: | Yes |
| Supported Digital Music Formats: | MP3, WMA |
| Camera Resolution (Picture): | 1.3 Megapixel |
| Camera Resolution (Video): | 176 x 144 (video message); 320 x 240 (storage) |
| Camera Features: | LED Flash, 3 to 10-Second Self-Timer, Night Mode, Spot Metering, Brightness & White Balance Controls |
| Max. Video Duration | 15 seconds (video message); 1 hour (storage) |
| Streaming Video: | Yes |
| Alarm Clock: | Yes, 3 programmable |
| Calculator: | Yes |
| Tip Calculator: | Yes |
| Calendar: | Yes, Event-programmable |
| Voice Memo: | Yes, up to 1 minute |
| Call Recording: | Yes, up to 5 minutes |
| BREW: | Yes |
| Games: | Yes, downloadable |
| Headset Jack: | 2.5mm, Stereo |
| Speakerphone: | Yes |
