= LG CU500 =

Mobile phone model

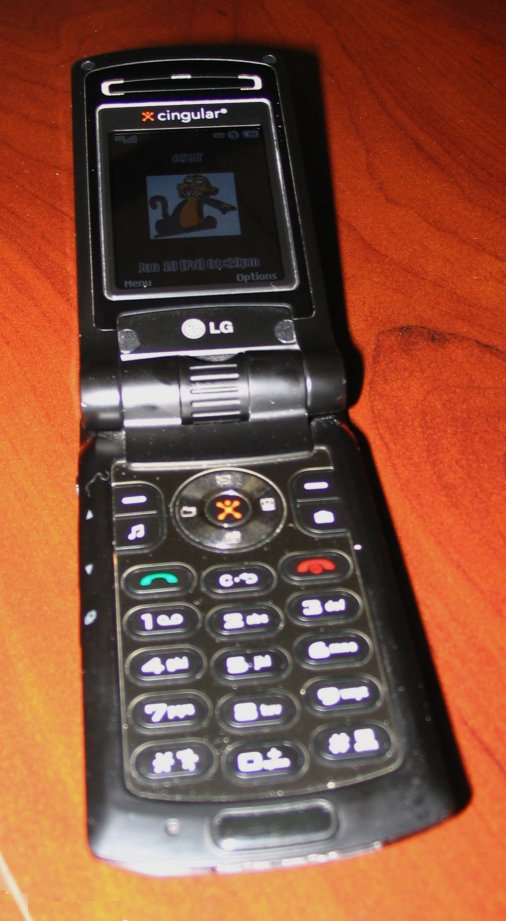
- Manufacturer: LG
- Availability by region: 2006
- Successor: LG CU575 (Trax)
- Compatible networks: GSM/GPRS/EDGE: 850/900/1800/1900 MHz; WCDMA (HSDPA/UMTS): 850/1900 MHz
- Form factor: Clamshell
- Dimensions: 3.80” x 1.95” x 0.76”
- Weight: 3.70 oz (105 g)
- Memory: 16 MB
- Removable storage: microSD
- Battery: Li-polymer, 1100 mAh
- Rear camera: 1.3 MP, 1280 x 960 pixels
- Display: 65K color TFT, 176x220 pixels
- External display: 65K color TFT, 96x96 pixels
- Connectivity: Bluetooth

The LG CU500 is a mobile phone manufactured by LG and was released in December 2006. It was LG Group's first cell phone in the United States to include HSDPA capability, and also the first cell phone to work with Cingular's HSDPA network. The LG CU500v is a software upgrade to the LG CU500 which supports video calls.

== Features ==
- Technical Specifications:
  - Network: GSM 850 / 900 / 1800 / 1900 / HSDPA 850 / 1900
  - Form Factor: Clamshell
  - Dimensions: 97 x 50 x 19 mm
  - Weight: 105 g
  - Antenna: Internal
  - Navigation: 5-Way Keypad
  - Battery Type: 1100 mAh Li-Ion
  - Talk Time: 5.00
  - Standby Time: 240
  - Memory: 16.0 MB
  - Expandable Memory: microSD / TransFlash
- Imaging:
  - Main Screen: 65000 colors (TFT)
  - 176 x 220 px
  - External Screen: 65000 colors (TFT)
  - 96 x 96 px
  - Camera: 1.3 MP / 1280 x 960 px / Rotate / 4X Zoom / Multi-Shot / Self-Timer / Video Recorder / Video Calling
- Audio:
  - MP3 Player: MP3 / AAC / AAC+ / WMA / MusicID / 3D Stereo Sound
  - FM Radio: MobiRadio
  - Speakerphone: Yes
  - Push-To-Talk: N/A
- Multimedia:
  - Wallpapers: 176 x 220 px
  - Screen Savers: 176 x 220 px
  - Ring Tones: 72 chord / MP3
  - Themes: Yes
  - Games: Java ME
  - Streaming Multimedia: Cingular Video / MobiTV
- Messaging:
  - SMS: Yes
  - EMS: Yes
  - MMS: Yes
  - Email: AOL / Hotmail / Yahoo!
  - Chat: AOL / ICQ / MSN / Yahoo!
  - Predictive Text: T9
- Applications:
  - Phonebook Capacity: 500
  - Calendar: Yes
  - To-Do List: Yes
  - WAP:2.0
  - Voice Commands: N/A
  - Calculator: Yes
- Connectivity:
  - Bluetooth: A2DP / DUN / HFP / HSP / OPP
  - Infrared Port: N/A
  - High-Speed Data: HSDPA
  - Wi-Fi: N/A
  - GPS: N/A
  - PC Sync: USB Mass Storage

== Notes ==
- Used in NBC's hit show, The Office.
- The LG CU500 is capable of updating its firmware over the air.
- Users must choose "allow" or "deny" every time a Java ME application accesses a data network.

== Software update ==
The LG CU500v is a software upgrade to the CU500, adding video calling features supported by AT&T's high-speed HSDPA broadband network. Providing even faster rates than UMTS for streaming TV, radio, and online services, the video calling feature integrates in a rotating 1.3-megapixel camera to take clips or still photos at up to 1280 x 960 px in resolution. Consumers can listen to MP3s or MobiRadio through Bluetooth A2DP profile for stereo music without wires.
