= LG Leon =

Android smartphone model from LG

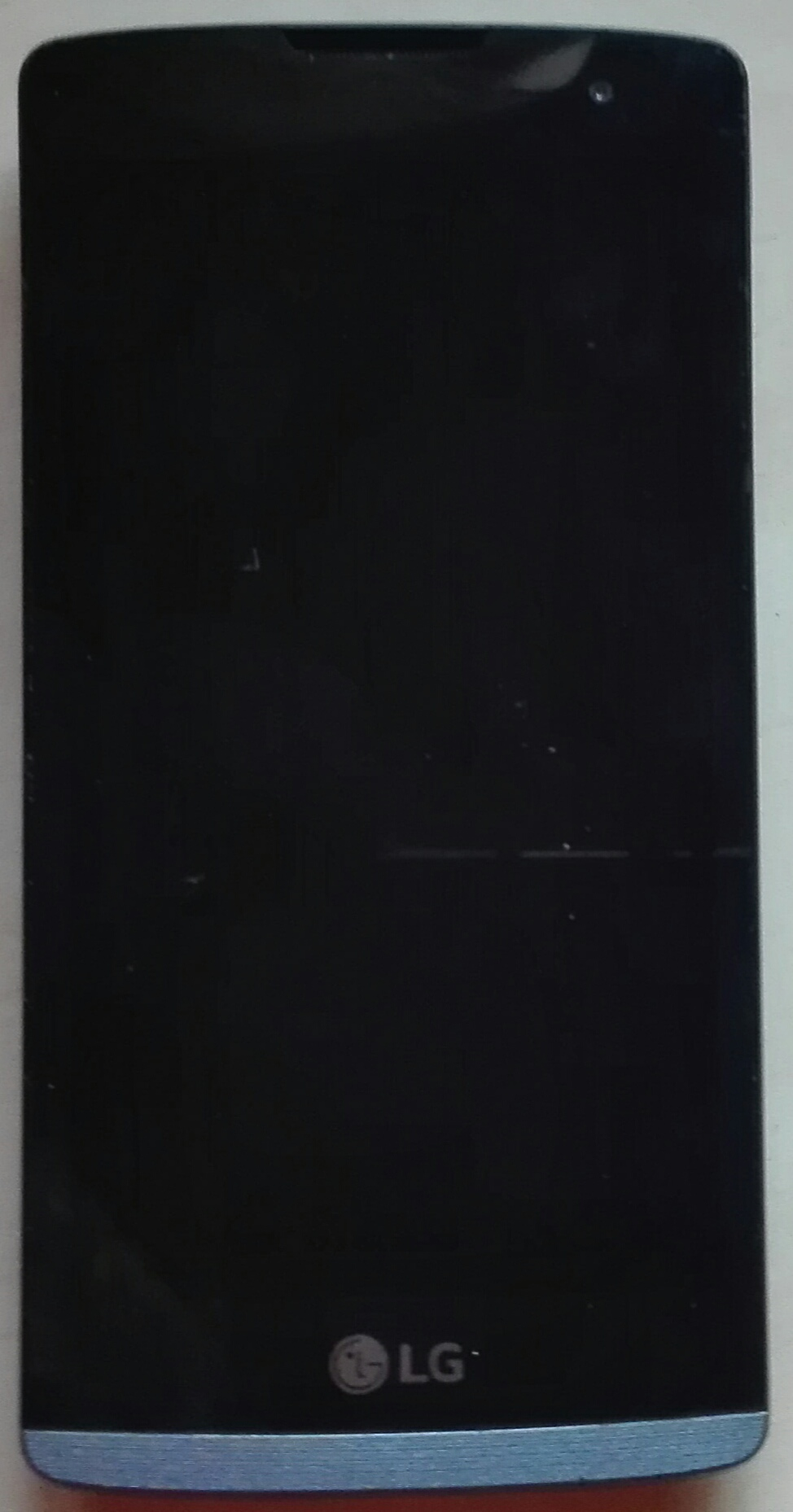
- Manufacturer: LG Electronics
- Type: Smartphone
- Series: LG Leon
- Availability by region: December 2014(US)
- Related: LG G4
- Compatible networks: GSM, HSDPA, LTE
- Form factor: Bar
- Dimensions: 4.5 inches
- Weight: 140 g (4.94 oz)
- Operating system: Android; Upgradable to 6.0 Original: 5.0.2
- CPU: Quad-core 1.2 GHz Cortex-A53
- GPU: Adreno 306
- Memory: 1 GB LPDDR2 RAM
- Storage: 8 GB
- Battery: Li-Ion 1900 mAh battery
- Rear camera: 5 megapixel 2560 x 1920 pixels, LED flash HD video (1080p) at 30 frames/s Smile and face detection.
- Front camera: 0.3 MP (640 x 480 pixels)
- Connectivity: 3.5 mm stereo audio jack Wi-Fi 802.11 a/b/g/n, Wi-Fi Hotspot, DLNA; Bluetooth 4.0 + A2DP micro-USB 2.0 (5-pin).
- Data inputs: Touch

The LG Leon (also known as the LG Risio, LG Sunset, and LG Tribute 2) is a smartphone designed and manufactured by LG Electronics. It was announced in February 2015.

== Availability ==
LG Leon was available in the US through T-Mobile, its subsidiary MetroPCS, and Sprint subsidiaries Boost Mobile & Virgin Mobile. In Mexico, it was sold through Telcel.

== Specifications ==
=== Hardware ===
LG Leon is powered by the Qualcomm Snapdragon 410 system-on-chip with a 1.2 GHz quad-core ARM Cortex-A53 64-bit CPU and an Adreno 306 GPU. The device comes with 1 GB RAM and 8 GB internal storage that is expandable up to 32 GB with microSD cards. It has a 1900 mAh removable Li-Ion battery.

LG Leon comes with a 4.5 FWVGA (854x480 pixels resolution) IPS LCD capacitive touchscreen with 16M colors, 218 ppi pixel density and 16:9 aspect ratio commonly used in DVD and HDTV formats.

LG Leon has a 5 MP (2560 x 1920 pixels) rear-facing camera that can record videos in HD and FullHD resolutions, and is paired with LED Flash. There is also a 0.3 MP (640 x 480 pixels, VGA) front-facing camera.

Connectivity options on the LG Leon include 4G LTE, Wi-Fi 802.11 b/g/n receiver and hotspot, Bluetooth 4.1. GPS, A-GPS and GLONASS. The device is notably equipped with an unblocked FM radio.

LG Leon measures 129.9 x 64.9 x 10.9 mm and weighs 140 grams.

=== Software features and services ===
The LG Leon runs on Google's Android 5.0 (Lollipop) operating system and is upgradeable to Android 6.0 (Marshmallow)

LG Leon comes with a hotspot application for tethering and many preloaded Android apps including Camera, Google Maps, Google Chrome, Gmail, YouTube, Google+, and the Play Store. The camera is also controlled with Gesture Shots.

== Variants ==
The LG Leon is also sold as several different models.

LG Sunset

The LG Sunset is identical to the Leon except it does not support tethering or the Marshmallow update. The Sunset is sold on TracFone Wireless and its subsidiaries and uses the AT&T GSM network. The Sunset also weighs slightly less than the Leon.

LG Risio

The LG Risio is another model identical to the Leon. The Risio is on the Cricket GSM network.

LG Power

The LG Power is physically identical to the Leon except it does not record HD Video and operates on Tracfone 3G CDMA network.

== See also ==
- LG Optimus series
