= LG CF360 =

Mobile phone model

The LG CF360 is a cellular phone made by LG, and was sold basically for AT&T. It was released in December 2009, just before Christmas. It is a basic slide-up phone. In addition to the phone being black with blue numbers and accents, the phone is also in black with red numbers and accents.

== Features ==
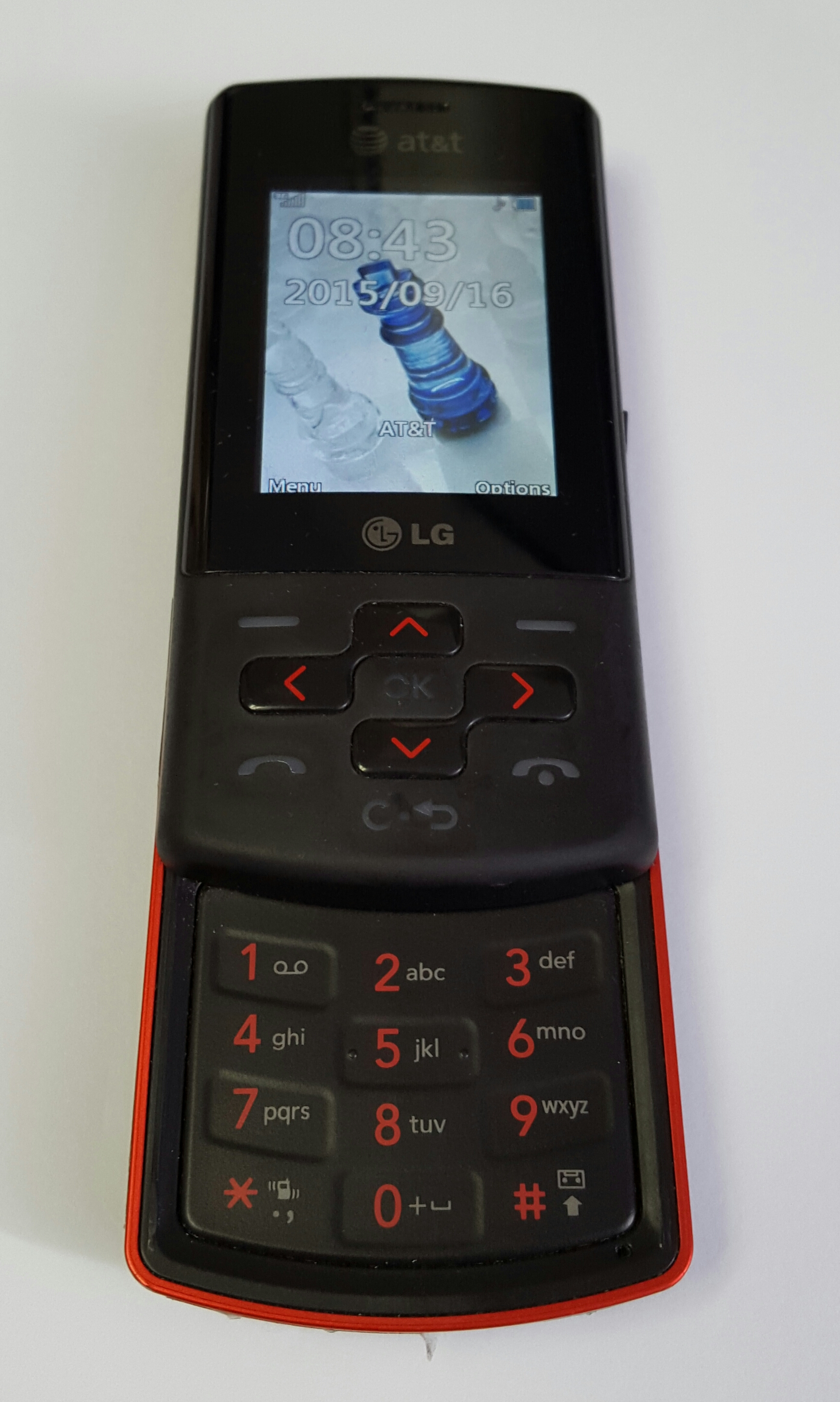
The LG CF360 with red numbers and accents.

- Media .NET
- Video Sharing
- Multimedia Messaging
- Mobile E-mail
- Camera Phone
- Bluetooth
- Mobile Games
- AT&T GPS
- 3G Speed
- Text Messaging
- Hands Free Speakerphone
- USB Connectivity .
