= LG VX8360 =

Mobile phone model

The LG-VX8360 was the replacement for the LG VX8350. The phones are almost identical. It was marketed as a multimedia phone with an external music player and a 1.3-megapixel camera.
