= LG GW620 =

Smartphone released by LG in 2009

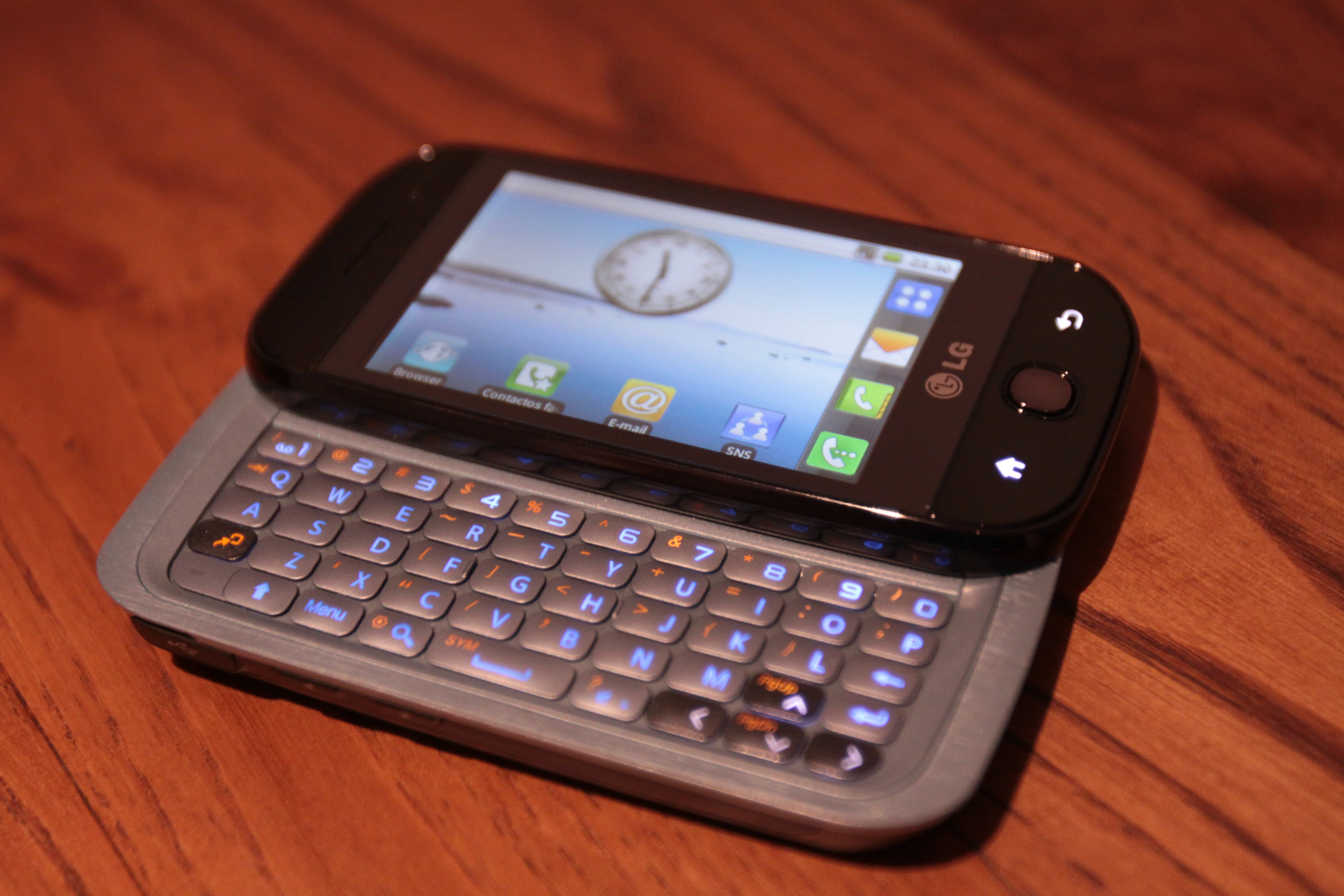
- An LG GW620, showing the LG interface of Android 1.5
- Manufacturer: LG Electronics
- Type: Smartphone
- Released: November 2009
- Operating system: Android 1.5 upgradable to Android 2.2 in some countries
- CPU: 528 MHz Qualcomm MSM7200A ARM11 processor
- Display: 320 x 480 px, 3.0 in
- Input: Resistive touchscreen TFT, QWERTY keyboard
- Camera: 5.0 megapixel, auto focus, LED flash
- Connectivity: microUSB 2.0, Bluetooth 2.0, Wi-Fi b/g, GPRS, EDGE, 3G
- Dimensions: 106 x 54.5 x 16 mm
- Weight: 139g
- Successor: LG Optimus GT540

The LG GW620, also known as the LG Eve and the LG InTouch Max, is a smartphone manufactured by LG Electronics. It is the first smartphone from LG that runs the Android operating system.

According to LG's managing director in Levant, Kevin Cha, "This Android phone is just one of many smartphone models we plan to introduce worldwide in the years ahead." In Canada, the LG GW620 is distributed by Rogers Wireless.

== See also ==
- List of Android smartphones
- Galaxy Nexus
