= GU230 =

LG-GU230
- Manufacturer: LG Electronics
- Availability by region: Q4 2009
- Compatible networks: GSM 850/900/1800/1900, GPRS Class 12, EDGE Class 12
- Form factor: Slider
- Dimensions: 104×48×15.2 mm (4.09×1.89×0.60 in)
- Weight: 89 g (3 oz)
- Operating system: S-Class
- Battery: 3.7V 900mAh
- Rear camera: Yes
- Display: 2.2"
- Connectivity: Bluetooth
- Data inputs: Keypad

The GU230 is a mobile phone manufactured by LG Electronics. The phone is designed to be low cost, and provide the essentials.

== Main Features ==
The LG GU230 is a basic slider phone. The key features are:

- Tactile keypad
- 2.2" LCD Screen
- FM radio (with recording)
- 1.3 Megapixel camera
- WAP
- Speaker Phone (Handsfree)
- CLDC 1.1 and MIDP 2.0 Java Support
- In-built Games
- 3D S-Class User Interface
- Calendar and Organiser
- Alarm
- Customisable Wallpaper
- Downloadable Ringtones & Wallpapers

== In The Box ==
When you buy the phone you should get:

- LG GU230 Mobile Phone
- LG Approved GU230 900mAh 3.7V Li-Ion Battery
- A/C Charger
- Handsfree (Headset with Microphone)

== Technical Specifications ==
Here are the technical specifications of this phone.

=== Carrier Support ===
Theoretically, the phone should work on any network, if you unlock it. However, according to the phones website, the phone will work on Crazy Johns only.

=== Operating Frequency ===
GSM: 850/900/1500/1900
UMTS: GPRS Class 12/EDGE Class 12

=== Dimensions ===
Height: 104mm
Width: 48mm
Thickness: 15.2mm
Weight: 89g

=== Screen ===
Size:2.2" LCD
Colours: 262k
Pixels:176x200 (Width x Height)

=== Memory ===
Internal: 6 Megabytes
Expandable: Yes, up to 4 Gigabytes MicroSD Phone Book: Up to 1000 entries

=== Messaging ===
The phone can send normal SMS text messages (with T9 (predictive text), as well as MMS, with Video MMS capabilities. The phone also has email capabilities.

=== Camera ===
The phone has a 1.3-megapixel camera with 2 times digital zoom.

=== Media ===
Music: Audio formats include MP3, AAC, WMA, RA, AMR and MIDI
Video: Video formats include H.263, and MPEG4
The phone also comes with an FM radio, and like most other phones the headset that comes with the phone is needed.

=== Battery ===
The battery that comes with the phone is 3.7V 900mAh Li-Ion, with 350 hours of stand-by time and 3.5 hours of talk time.

=== Connectivity ===
The phone comes with Bluetooth and a can be synced with a PC, but you have to buy the USB cable separately. It has a web upload speed of 48 kbit/s.
