= LG G1500 =

Mobile phone model

1500
- Manufacturer: LG
- Availability by region: 2004
- Compatible networks: GSM 900/1800 (Dual band)
- Form factor: Candybar
- Dimensions: 105×44×21 mm (4.13×1.73×0.83 in)
- Weight: 80 g (3 oz)
- Memory: Phonebook 255 entries
- Removable storage: none
- Battery: Li-Ion 850 mAh
- Rear camera: none
- Display: Monochrome 128 x 64 pixels
- Connectivity: CSD/GPRS (WML)

The LG G1500 or G1500 is a GSM mobile phone made by LG Electronics with a monochrome LCD. It supports GPRS, which is very notable because other handsets of its category never include a GPRS feature.
