= LG VX8350 =

Mobile phone model

- Compatible networks: CDMA 800 and 1900
- Dimensions: 3.73" x 1.97" x .87" (91 x 49 x 23 mm)
- Weight: 3.30 oz (94 g)
- Memory: 3MB, expandable
- Display: 220x176 pixels, 262,000 colors
- Connectivity: Bluetooth, USB

The LG VX8350 was a mobile phone designed by LG Group to replace the LG VX8300, and has in turn been replaced by the LG VX8360. It uses a qualcomm msm6500 SoC. The phone features a 1.3 megapixel camera, but did not have flash capacity.

The complete LG VX8350 list of specifications are:

Type	Specification Average cost at store - $79.99 after $50 mail in rebate. (As of October 2007); Average refurbished cost - $99.99
Modes	CDMA 800 / CDMA 1900 (Digital Dual-Band)
Weight	3.30 oz
Dimensions	3.73" x 1.97" x .87"
Form Factor	Clamshell - Internal Antenna
Battery Life	Talk: Up To 207 Minutes (≈3+ hours) / Standby: Up To 210 Hours (≈8+ days)
Battery Type	Lithium Ion 1000 mAh
Display	Type: LCD (Color TFT/TFD) Colors: 262,144 (18-bit) Size: 220 x 176 pixels
Platform / OS	3.1.4.65 Software: 2.0.5.v1)
Memory	36 MB (built-in, flash shared memory)
Phone Book Capacity	1000
2nd Display	Location: Front 65,000-color TFT LCD / 160 x 128 pixels
Alarm	Yes
Bluetooth	version 1.1 / supports headset, handsfree, dial-up networking (DUN), stereo audio, phonebook access, basic printing, object push, file transfer, and basic imaging profiles
BREW	Yes
Calculator	plus tip calculator
Calendar	Yes
Camera	Resolution: 1.3-megapixel no-flash / self-timer, night mode, macro mode func
Custom Graphics	Yes
Custom Ringtones	Yes
Data-Capable	Yes
Digital TTY/TDD	Yes
EMS / Picture Messaging	Yes
Expansion Card	Card Type: microSD
Games	Yes
GPS / Location	Yes
Headset Jack (2.5 mm)	Yes
Hearing Aid Compatible	Rating: M3 (mostly compatible)
High-Speed Data	Technology: 1xEV-DO r0
Low-Speed Data	"Quick 2 Net" (QNC): unsupported
MMS	Yes
Multiple Languages	Languages Supported: English, Spanish
Multiple Numbers per Name	Numbers per entry: 5 plus 2 email addresses
Music Player	Supported Formats: MP3 with equalizer
Picture ID	Yes
Polyphonic Ringtones	Chords: 72
Predictive Text Entry	Technology: T9
Side Keys	on left and right when closed
Speaker Phone	Type: Full-Duplex
Streaming Multimedia	Yes
Text Messaging	2-Way: Yes
USB	Yes
Vibrate	Yes
Video Capture	Yes
Voice Dialing	speaker-independent / plus voice command and text-to-speech
Voice Memo	Number of entries: 200 up to 1 minute each
Wireless Internet	Browser Software: Openwave 6.2.3.2
