= LG VX8100 =

Mobile phone model

VX8100
- Manufacturer: LG
- Availability by region: July 15, 2005
- Predecessor: LG VX8000
- Successor: LG VX8300
- Weight: 4.16 oz (118 g)
- Removable storage: MiniSD
- Rear camera: 1.3-megapixel
- Display: 18-bit 176x220
- External display: 16-bit 128x128
- Hearing aid compatibility: M3/T3

The LG VX8100 is a mobile phone that was available through Verizon Wireless in 2005 and 2006. It used Verizon's EV-DO network and was one of the first phones to support V CAST service. It also featured Bluetooth capability, stereo speakers, and a MiniSD slot.

== Reception ==
The VX8100 received mix reviews. Some compared it unfavorably to its predecessor, the VX8000, because the VX8100 was heavier, had a shorter battery life, a protruding antenna, a smaller screen, and did not include an analog compatibility mode Another source of criticism was that there were four different firmware versions of the phone—none of which were marked on the box—which made for inconsistent consumer experiences.

However, Laptop magazine rated it 4 out of 5 stars, mostly based on its multimedia functionality and faster data rate.

Based on call quality, features, and durability the VX8100 continues to retain a customer base years after initial launch.

== Detailed Specs ==
- Network: CDMA 800/1900
- Main LCD: 18-bit 176x220
- External LCD: 16-bit 128x128
- Camera: 1.3-megapixel, 8x digital zoom, 1280x960
