= LG Enlighten (VS700) =

QWERTY Android mobile device

- Brand: LG
- Manufacturer: LG
- Type: Smartphone
- First released: September 22, 2011
- Availability by region: September 2011
- Discontinued: Yes
- Compatible networks: CDMA, EV-DO Rev. A Carrier: Verizon Wireless
- Form factor: Side-sliding QWERTY
- Dimensions: 114 mm × 58 mm × 15 mm (4.49 in × 2.28 in × 0.59 in)
- Weight: 157 g (5.5 oz)
- Operating system: Android 2.3.4 Gingerbread
- System-on-chip: Qualcomm MSM7627T
- CPU: 800 MHz
- GPU: Adreno 200
- Storage: 150 MB
- Removable storage: microSDHC, up to 32 GB (2 GB card included)
- Battery: Removable Li-ion 1540 mAh
- Rear camera: 3.2 megapixels, autofocus, 480p@24fps video
- Front camera: No
- Display: 3.2 in (81 mm) TFT LCD, 256K colors 320 x 480 pixels (~180 ppi)
- Sound: 3.5 mm jack, loudspeaker
- Connectivity: Wi-Fi 802.11 b/g/n, Bluetooth 3.0, Micro-USB 2.0
- SAR: Head: 0.72 W/kg, Body: 1.31 W/kg

The LG Englighten (VS700) is a side-sliding Android QWERTY mobile phone manufactued and designed by LG Electronics It was released on September 22, 2011, for the Verizon Wireless carrier.

Official stores went sale on September 29 with a price of $79.99.

== Specifications ==
=== Design & appearance ===
In terms of design, it was identical to the Optimus lineup than the Ally. With dimensions at 4.5 inches high, 2.3 inches wide and 0.58 inches thick, it weighs 5.54 ounces.

=== Hardware and software ===
The Enlighten VS700 features a side-sliding physical QWERTY keypad, a 3.2-inch TFT display with a resolution of 320 × 480 pixels, an 800MHz central processor, a 3.2-megapixel camera, a 150-megabyte internal storage, a 32-gigabyte SanDisk card, and a 2GB card from Verizon.

The Enlighten runs on Android 2.3.4 Gingerbread with the pre-installed Adobe Flash Player 10 in the browser. It also has GPS, 3G with EV-DO Rev. A, and a Wi-Fi.
