= AX265 (LG Banter) =

Mobile phone model

The LG Banter (codename AX265) is a phone that was released on March 23, 2009, and is a successor to the LG Scoop. It has side-slider design and a 1.3-megapixel camera. There are also interchangeable face and back plates in green and silver. The Banter has two carriers: Alltel Wireless and U.S. Cellular, with prices of $20 and $50 respectively. The Banter supported Bluetooth and had a microSD card slot. MicroSD supported up to 16GB. The size of its touch-screen display was 3-inches.
