= LG Black Zafiro (MG810) =

Mobile phone model

Black Zafiro
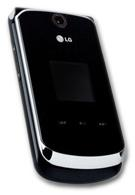
- Manufacturer: LG
- Compatible networks: GSM 900/1800/1900 or GSM 850/1800/1900 MHz
- Form factor: Clamshell
- Dimensions: 92×47×14.9 mm (3.62×1.85×0.59 in)
- Weight: 118 g (4 oz)
- Memory: 128 MB
- Battery: 800 mAh Li-Ion
- Rear camera: 1.3 Megapixels
- Display: TFT, 262K colours, (176x220 QVGA)
- External display: 96x96 (QVGA) 65,000 colours
- Connectivity: Bluetooth v2.0 + EDR (supports A2DP), USB v2.0

The LG MG810 (a.k.a. The LG Black Zafiro) is a mobile phone manufactured by LG Electronics. This phone is the GSM version of the phone commonly known as the Chocolate Flip. This clam shell style phone has touch sensitive music controls on the top, similar to the keypad used for navigation in the LG Chocolate series.
