= LG T385 =

Mobile phone

- Manufacturer: LG
- Availability by region: May 2012
- Compatible networks: GSM 850/900/1800/1900, GPRS, EDGE
- Form factor: Candybar
- Dimensions: 103×59.5×10.7 mm (4.06×2.34×0.42 in)
- Weight: 98 g (3 oz)
- Operating system: Proprietary WISE UI, Qualcomm Brew MP
- CPU: Infineon PMB8815 V1.0 (Intel X-Gold 215, ARM11) (32-bit) 208 MHz
- Memory: 50MB
- Removable storage: microSD, up to 16GB
- Battery: Li-ion, 950 mAh
- Rear camera: 2.0 Mega Pixel Fixed-Focus Videos QCIF@15fps
- Display: 3.2", 240x320 pixels (~125 ppi pixel density) capacitive touchscreen with 262.144 colours
- Sound: MP3/MP4/H.263/AAC/AAC+/WMA/RealAudio
- Connectivity: microUSB 2.0/Bluetooth 2.1+A2DP/Wi-Fi 802.11

The T385, also known as LG Cookie Smart, is a touchscreen mobile phone, single sim version of LG T375. LG continues to be targeted at the entry-level touchscreen markets keeping the cost of the T385 as low as possible by omitting some of the features found on high-end products, such as GPS and 3G.

It is using ARM11 CPU at 208 MHz.

Its main feature is a 3.2-inch, 240 x 320 pixel touchscreen. The T385 also has support for auto-rotating display. It has a 2.0 MP Camera with MPEG-4 video capture at 15 frame/s. There is support for video playback up to 29 frames per second. The T385 has a stereo FM radio with RDS. Other software include a document viewer for DOC, XLS, and PDF formats, and a Java MIDP 2.0 games player. Standby time is up to 696 hours and talk time is up to 14 hours.

A nearly-identical model, the LG T580 has exactly same specifications as LG T385, except it uses MTK-based CPU, has silver battery cover and a 32 MB more RAM than in LG T385 of which has only 64 MB of RAM and black or red battery cover.

== Multimedia support ==
LG T370/T375/T385:

- Supported audio capabilities: MP3, WAV, eAAC+
- Supported video capabilities: MPEG-4 H.263

LG T580:

- Supported audio capabilities: MP3, WAV, WMA, eAAC+
- Supported video capabilities: MPEG-4 H.263, H.264

Model	Number of SIMs	WLAN
LG T370	Dual SIM	No
LG T375	Dual SIM	Yes
LG T385	Single SIM	Yes
