= LG Trax (CU575) =

Mobile phone model

LG CU575 (Trax)
- Manufacturer: LG
- First released: United States August 14, 2007; 18 years ago (AT&T)
- Predecessor: CU500
- Compatible networks: GSM/GPRS/EDGE: 850/900/1800/1900 MHz; WCDMA (HSDPA/UMTS): 850/1900 MHz
- Form factor: Clamshell
- Dimensions: 3.89” x 2.01” x 0.62”
- Weight: 3.55 oz (101 g)
- Memory: 16 MB
- Removable storage: microSD
- Battery: Li-polymer, 980 mAh
- Rear camera: 1.3 MP, 1280 x 960, 640x480, 320x240, 160x120 pixels
- Display: 65K color TFT, 176x220 pixels, 11 lines
- External display: 65K color TFT, 128x160 pixels, 9 lines
- Connectivity: Bluetooth

The LG CU575, also known as the Trax, is a 3G GSM/UMTS mobile phone carried by AT&T Mobility. It is designed to run on AT&T's UMTS frequencies of 850 and 1900 MHz. The phone features a slim design similar to the Motorola RAZR series, and also features external music controls and a microSD memory card slot supporting cards up to 4 GB. The phone is a replacement for the LG CU500.

== Launch ==
The LG CU575 was supposed to be released on June 17, 2007, but was delayed due to a software issue preventing some DRM enabled songs to be played. It was displayed at a holiday showcase two days later. The phone was eventually released on August 14, 2007 once the issues had been resolved. On launch it costed $130 after a mail-in rebate and signing a two-year contract.

== Features ==
The phone was designed as a multimedia and music phone and is compatible with AT&T's eMusic service, Napster, MobiTV, and XM Radio. It came with a music recognition application and allowed for playlists to be made on the phone itself.

== Reception ==
CNET gave the LG Trax a 7.0 out of 10, with points given to the lightweight design and wide variety of features, but criticizing the small keypad and music control touch pad.
