= LG LX140 =

Mobile phone model

- Manufacturer: LG Electronics
- Compatible networks: PCS
- Form factor: Clamshell
- Dimensions: 3.5 in × 1.9 in × 0.9 in (89 mm × 48 mm × 23 mm)
- Weight: 2.7 oz (77 g)
- Display: 128x128 pixels, 65k-color STN Display

The LG LX140, or LG Aloha, is a clamshell type phone from LG Electronics. It was released exclusively to U.S. carrier Virgin Mobile. Its features included a 128x128 pixel, 65k-color STN LCD, SMS messaging, mobile web, scheduler, world clock and speakerphone.

Upon release, the LG Aloha cost $34.99 for users of Virgin's prepaid service.
