= LG KF510 =

Mobile phone model

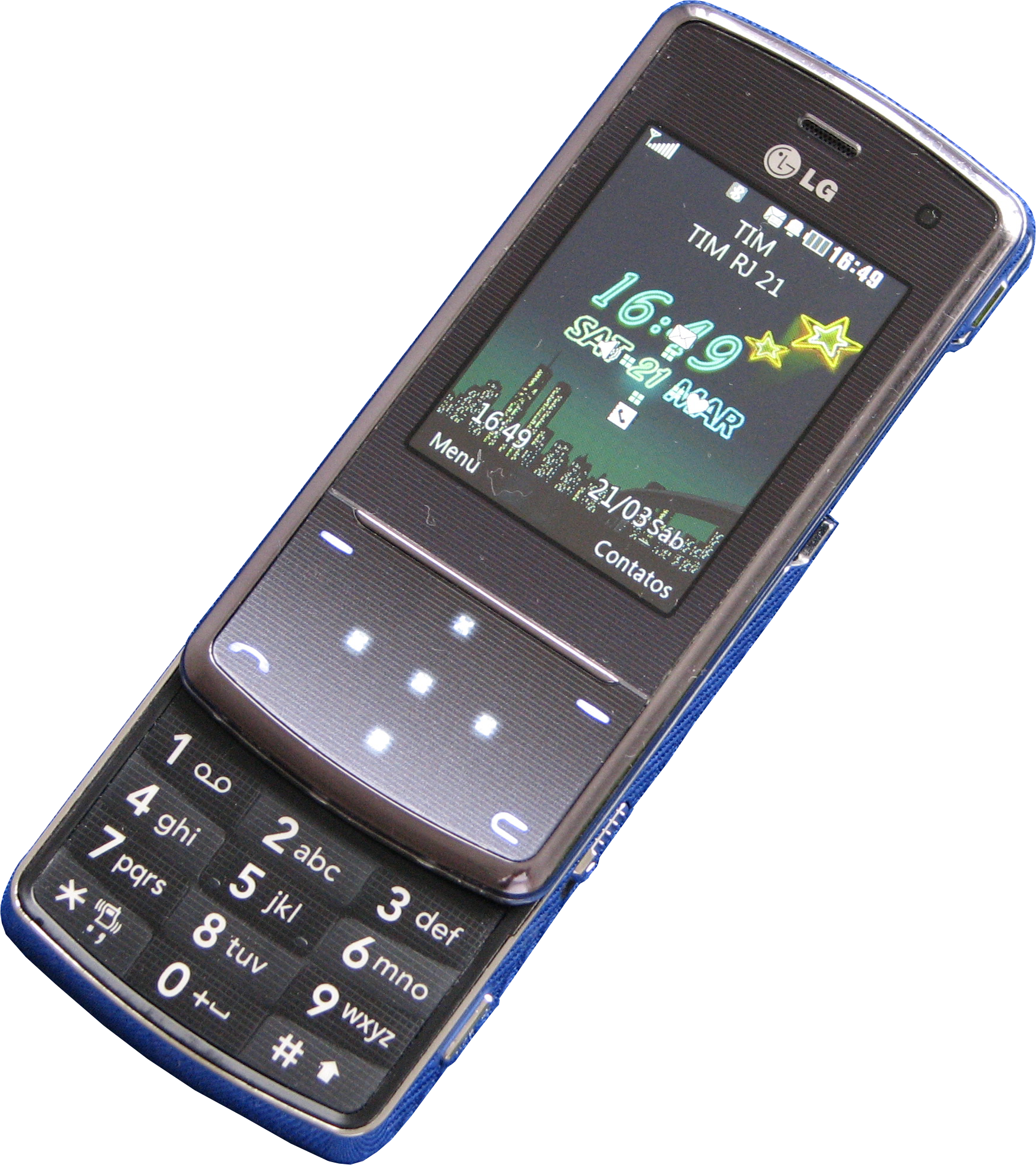
- Dimensions: 104.5×49.5×10.9 mm (4.11×1.95×0.43 in)
- Removable storage: Memory card slot/microSD
- Display: 2.2" QVGA, 240x320 pixels
- Connectivity: Bluetooth, USB

The LG KF510 is a GSM mobile phone from LG Electronics which debuted in the 1st quarter of 2008. The KF510 was a slider phone, with a tempered glass finish. The finish was prone to fingerprint marks.

Measuring 11mm (.43"), the KF510 sports a metal frame and tempered glass display.
