= LG Dare =

Mobile phone model

LG Dare (VX9700)
- Availability by region: 2008
- Discontinued: early 2010 Verizon Wireless
- Compatible networks: CDMA, 900/1800
- Dimensions: 4.1"H x 2.2"W x 0.5"D
- Weight: 3.76 oz (107 g)
- Memory: 200 MB, 28 MB RAM
- Display: 3inch./240x400 resolution/262K colors, resistive touch screen
- Connectivity: Bluetooth / USB Cable
- Hearing aid compatibility: M3/T3

The LG VX9700 (or "LG Dare") is a CDMA touch screen cell phone made by LG. The phone features touch screen navigation, a 3.2-megapixel camera with face recognition and many photo enhancing tools, a camcorder, customizable shortcut menus, handwriting recognition, and a multitask music player. The LG Dare is the third phone to have Rev. A technology - after the Sprint Mogul and Touch.

In the US, the Dare was released online June 26, 2008 and was released in Verizon Wireless stores on July 3, 2008. The device is available in Canada on the Telus Mobility network, as the LG LG9700, using the same model name (Dare) as the U.S. market device. The only difference between the Verizon Wireless and Telus devices is that the Verizon Wireless version of the device includes a black front face with a black battery cover and the Verizon branding. The Telus version of this device includes a medium gray front face and silver battery cover with the Telus branding. The phones also include different User Interfaces specific to their carriers, Verizon Wireless and Telus.

== Display and menus ==
The TFT screen has a resolution of 240x400 pixels and can display 262,144 colors. When waiting for input, the phone displays its Standby screen or turns off the screen and disables the touchscreen. When charging, the phone can display a slideshow, a "desk clock", a calendar, or nothing.

The Standby screen displays the network type, signal strength, Location setting, and battery condition across the top. The background of the screen can be set to a slide show of images, a Flash animation, a video, or an image. The Standby screen can also display a translucent date/time bar of your choosing.

Across the bottom is the Softkey menu, a set of five icons that provide easy access to important features: Messaging, Call, Menu, Phonebook, and Favorites. Touching the background or the Shortcut Menu on the right side of the phone brings up a customizable menu with 11 icons. A shortcut can be set to a program (including downloaded ones), a menu, a library, and other features on the phone.

== Connectivity and power ==
The Dare works on a dual-band CDMA cell network and is 3G capable. It also has a stereo 2.1 Bluetooth radio, and can access the internet through the cellular connection. Besides the Dare's 200 MB internal memory, it has a flash memory slot for microSD or microSDHC, supporting cards up to 16 GB in size. The phone also supports GPS, PIM, and BREW, as well.

The phone has a 3.5mm stereo jack for headphones and a microUSB connector for syncing with a PC and charging. The Dare retail box comes with a USB cable and an AC charging brick with a USB port for connecting the cable. The battery capacity is 1100mAh and is rated for up to 4.66 hours (280 minutes) of talk time, or up to 360 hours (15 days) on standby.

== Phone calls and phone book ==
To make calls, one can press the phone icon on the softkey bar or the phonebook icon. Pressing the phone icon brings up a standard 12-key alphanumeric keypad, as well as options for speaking or drawing the number.

Pressing the phonebook icon brings up the phonebook. This list is alphabetized and has an alphabetical index across the top for quick access. Also at the top is quick access to ICE information (ICE is an acronym for In Case of Emergency and is used in cell phones to indicate emergency contact information to a third party). The phonebook can store multiple numbers, email addresses, and other information for each contact, including a personalized image and ringtone option.

The Dare also has a feature which allows the user to save a list of their favorite contacts and have quick access to them. This Favorites menu is accessible through the star icon on the softkey bar.

== Camera ==
The LG Dare has a 3.2-megapixel camera with a Schneider-Kreuznach autofocus lens and an LED flash. Some features of the camera include 5 different resolutions, five white balance presets, five color effects, four ISO settings (Auto ISO, ISO 100, ISO 200, and ISO 400), digital zoom (not available on highest resolution) and six preset scenes. Other options include multishot, shutter sounds (three of them), auto focus, self-timer, and four different shot types (Normal, Panorama, Split, and Frame). An innovative feature called SmartPic offers face detection and enhances images with face color compensation.

The camcorder function provides two quality options and several resolutions to allow the user to save high-quality video or lower resolutions suited for sending over MMS. The video camera has the ability to digital zoom. The Dare is one of the first phones available in the US to record in high speed.

== Messaging and text input ==
The Dare supports EMS, MMS, SMS, and Instant Messaging. For this and any other text inputs, the phone provides several options. One can bring up a standard keypad with letters and use multi-tap (T9 (predictive text)) or a word-guessing system. If the phone is turned sideways, it senses the change in orientation and brings up a full keyboard. Also of note is a handwriting feature which allows the user to write numbers or letters by writing with a finger. In each of these modes, the user must manually change the setting (capital or lowercase letters, numbers, or symbols) to allow the phone to know what type of character is being input.

== Ringtones and multimedia playback ==
The phone uses MP3 polyphonic and Truetone ringtones and has vibrate options. It also plays videos and music in MP3, AAC (unprotected only), AAC+, and WMA formats.

== Known Issues ==
A peculiar coding error never addressed nor corrected on LG's VX9700 chassis, there is a longstanding software texting bug using "complete-the-word" mode. When the user tilts the phone sideways, transitioning the screen from vertical to horizontal mode, the phone unintentionally reverts user control, back to Abc mode, from the "complete-the-word" mode.

== Specs ==
LG Dare specifications

Category	Sub-Category	Info	Notes
Network	Type	CDMA dual band (800/1900 MHz)	
Network	Data	CDMA2000 1xRTT/1xEV-DO rev.0/1xEV-DO rev.A	
Network	3G Capable	Yes	
Size	Dimensions	4.1h x 2.2w x .5d	
Size	Weight	3.8 oz (110 g)	
Design	Form	Candybar	
Design	Antenna	Internal	
Battery	Type	Li - Ion	
Battery	Talk	Up to 4.66 (280 mins) hours of Talk Time	
Battery	Standby	Up to 360 hours (15 days) of Stand-by Time	
Battery	Capacity	1100 mAh	
Main Display	Resolution	240 x 400 pixels	
Main Display	Type	262 144 colors, TFT	
Main Display	Features	Light and Proximity Sensors	
Main Display	Touch Screen	Resistive	
Camera	Resolution	3.2 megapixels Resolution	
Camera	Video	VGA (640x480)	
Camera	Features	Flash: Yes, Schneider Kreuznach lens, Digital zoom	
Notifications	Polyphonic Ringtones	Yes, MP3	
Notifications	Vibration Alert	Yes	
Messaging	Text Send/Receive	Yes	
Messaging	EMS	Yes	
Messaging	MMS	Yes	
Messaging	Instant Messaging	Yes	
Multimedia	Video Playback	Video player for MP4, 3GP, 3G2 Formats	
Multimedia	Music Player	MP3, AAC, AAC+, WMA formats supported	
Memory	Memory Slot	microSD/microSDHC (up to 16gb), 200mb internal memory	
Connectivity	Internet	Full HTML browser	3g2/AAC Audio/Video web browser player
Connectivity	USB	microUSB	
Connectivity	Bluetooth	Stereo 2.1, yes (also works with movies and GPS)	
Connectivity	Connectors	HeadPhone Jack (3.5mm)	
Other Features	PhoneBook	1000 contacts, Caller groups supported, Multiple Numbers Per Contact, Picture ID, Ring ID	
Other Features	PIM	Alarm, Calendar (limited to x number of events, not by memory), Calculator, TO-DO, Stopwatch, World Clock, Notebook, Notepad & Drawing Pad with handwriting recognition	
Other Features	Voice	Recording, Speaker Phone	
Other Features	WiFi	No	
Other Features	BREW	Yes	
Other Features	Email	Yes	
Other Features	GPS	Yes	
Other Features	FCC Approved	Yes	

== See also ==
- LG Prada (KE850)
- LG Vu

== Sources ==
- Dare by LG
- LG Dare (Verizon Wireless)
- LG Dare Updates
- LG VX9700 looks to be Verizon's Prada-like touchscreen phone
- Update 4 with picture: LG VX9700 is Verizon's PRADA-like phone (Phone Arena)
- LG Dare at WikiSpecs-Detailed Specsheet
- FCC Link
- IntoMobile.com leak of July 4th 2008 release
