= LG Crystal =

Mobile phone model

LG-GD900
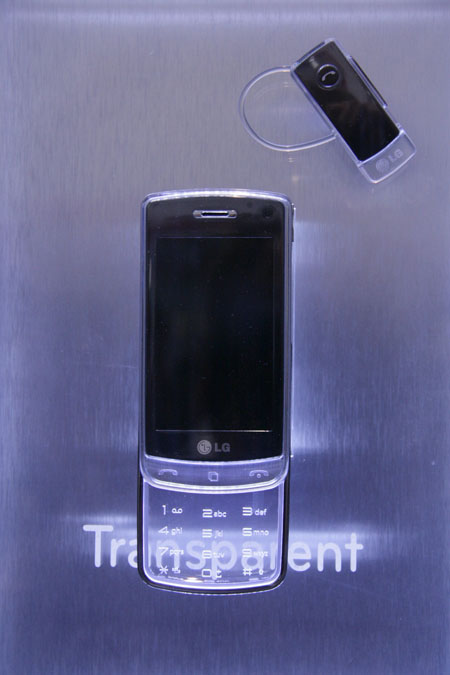
- Manufacturer: LG Electronics
- Availability by region: Q2 2009
- Compatible networks: HSDPA 7.2 Mbit/s
- Form factor: Slider
- Dimensions: 13.4 mm thick
- Operating system: LG S-class interface
- Memory: 1.5 GB
- Removable storage: up to 32 GB
- Battery: 1000 mAh
- Rear camera: 8 MP
- Display: 800×480, 16 million colours, WVGA
- Connectivity: Bluetooth 2.0, WiFi
- Data inputs: keypad, capacitive 3" touchscreen, gesture recognition

The LG-GD900 (codenamed and retroactively called LG Crystal) is a fashion-focused slider with high end specifications phone from LG Electronics that was publicly unveiled at Mobile World Congress 2009. It is claimed to be the world’s first transparent design phone. It comes with a dedicated Bluetooth headset that is also transparent in parts.

The transparent part of the GD900 is the sliding keypad, which is designed to glow when in operation. The main casing material is metal and the phone is 13.4 mm thick. LG decided to ship GD900 with a tempered glass keypad like a screen.

In terms of features, the phone supports 7.2 Mbit/s HSDPA and has a rear-mounted 8 MP camera with flash. LG released most of the phone's specification at the launch event in London on 28 May 2009. The GD900 was released in mid-June in Germany, and in 40 other countries worldwide on 1 July 2009.
