= LG Optimus (original) =

Android-based smartphone

LG Optimus GT540

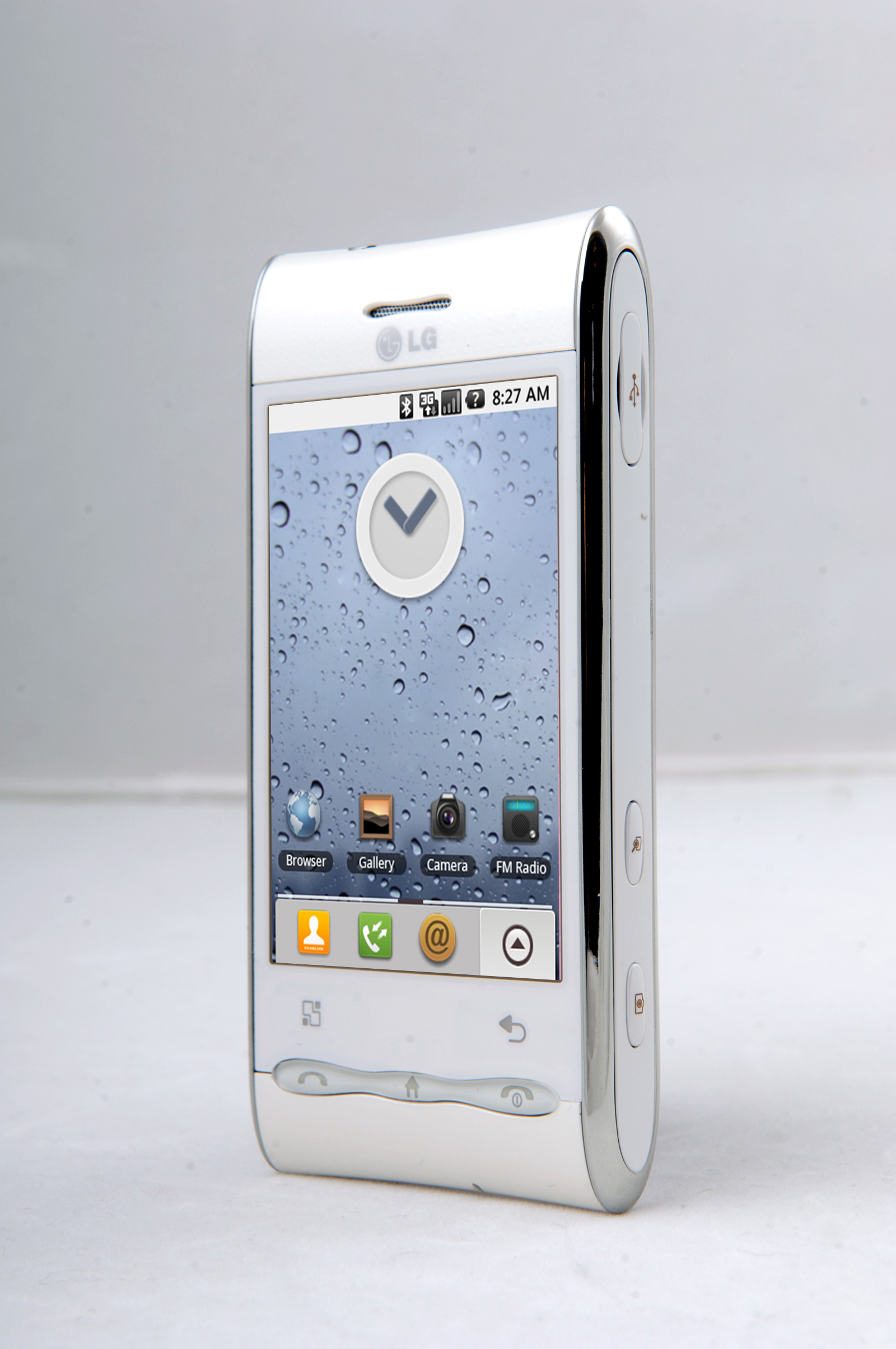
- LG Optimus
- Manufacturer: LG Electronics, Inc.
- Type: Smartphone
- Series: Optimus
- First released: June 2010; 16 years ago
- Predecessor: LG GW620
- Successor: LG Optimus One
- Related: LG Optimus Q
- Compatible networks: GSM 850/900/1800/1900; HSPA 900/2100; HSDPA 7.2
- Form factor: Slate
- Dimensions: 109 mm (4.3 in) H 54.5 mm (2.15 in) W 12.9 mm (0.51 in) D
- Weight: 115.5 g (4.1 oz)
- Operating system: Android 1.6 "Donut"; Upgradeable to Android 2.1 Eclair; Unofficial upgrades to Android 2.2 Froyo, 2.3 Gingerbread, 4.0 Ice Cream Sandwich
- CPU: 600 MHz Qualcomm MSM7227
- GPU: Adreno 200 Imageon
- Memory: 512 MB ROM (Only 140 MB accessible for user data); 256 MB RAM (Only 156 MB accessible)
- Removable storage: microSD (supports up to 32 GB)
- Battery: LGIP-400N; 1,500mAh, 5.6Wh, 3.7V; Internal Rechargeable Li-ion; User replaceable
- Rear camera: 3.15 Megapixel 2048x1536 px max. Autofocus; VGA video @ 17fps
- Display: TFT LCD, 3 inches (76 mm)-inch/76-mm 320×480 px 252K colors
- Connectivity: 3.5 mm TRRS; Bluetooth 2.1 + EDR with A2DP micro USB 2.0; Wi-Fi 802.11b/g
- Data inputs: Resistive touchscreen A-GPS; Accelerometer; Magnetometer
- SAR: Head - 0.93 W/kg; Body - 0.63 W/kg

The LG Optimus, also known as the LG Optimus GT540, LG GT540 Swift and the LG Loop GT540, is a mid-level Android smartphone designed and manufactured by LG Electronics. Released running Android 1.6 Donut, the device can be officially upgraded to Android 2.1 Eclair via an LG software release.

The Optimus is designed for first-time smartphone users and is available in four colors: black, white, pink and silver. First announced in April 2010 and first sold in June 2010, the Optimus is available from wireless service providers worldwide. Reviews for the device have been generally positive. Although the phone lacks cutting-edge hardware, reviewers have found that the device performs well considering its reasonable price.

== Description ==
The Optimus, also known as the GT540 Swift and the Loop GT540, is a mid-level Android smartphone designed and manufactured by LG Electronics. The GT540 Optimus ships with Android 1.6 Donut, but can be officially upgraded to Android 2.1 Eclair via an LG software release. Android enthusiasts have created unofficial updates that allow the GT540 to run Android 2.2 Froyo, Android 2.3 Gingerbread and Android 4.0 Ice Cream Sandwich.

LG designed the Optimus for first time smartphone users, marketing the device under the slogan "Optimal performance for first time smartphone users."

== Reception ==
The LG Optimus received a generally positive reception.

TechRadar commented, "Given that it's free on £15 a month contracts, you don't really have the right to expect top notch features. And, taking that into consideration, we have to say that the LG Optimus is a nicely rounded phone." Although the reviewer added that "there's nothing outstanding about it, but the features fit together well enough." Electricpig.co.uk was slightly less enthusiastic. While praising the phone's "surprisingly pleasant media skills", the reviewer also criticized the device's resistive touch screen and preferred the older LG GW620 in some respects.

== Custom ROMs ==
LG previously claimed that Optimus is not capable of running Android 2.2 (Froyo) due to its low hardware specifications, but developers Quarx and Ankuch successfully ported CyanogenMod 6 to GT540. Another developer, Mur4ik, successfully ported CyanogenMod 7 based on Gingerbread. A few months later, a developer named Mike Gapinski managed to get Android 4.0 Ice Cream Sandwich to GT540.
Only 1 month after the Jelly Bean Source was released even Android 4.1 was ported to it.

== Known problems ==
The Optimus does not support all Bluetooth devices. One such issue is connecting to a Bluetooth Keyboard, the device will pair over Bluetooth, but is not able to establish an ongoing connection. This has been noted with the 49 key mini keyboard. LG Support confirmed this as a software issue that they do not have an existing patch to fix.

== See also ==
- Galaxy Nexus
- List of Android smartphones
