= LG Arena (KM900) =

Multimedia phone

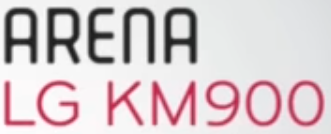
- Manufacturer: LG Electronics
- Availability by region: March 2009 (Europe)
- Compatible networks: GSM 850/900/1800/1900, UMTS 900/1200, GPRS, EDGE, HSDPA 7.2 Mbit/s
- Form factor: Candybar
- Dimensions: 105.9×55.3×11.96 mm (4.169×2.177×0.471 in)
- Weight: 105 g (4 oz)
- Memory: 128 MB DRAM, 256 MB NAND ROM; 8 GB flash internal
- Removable storage: microSD (up to 32 GB)
- Battery: Li-ion, 1000mAh
- Rear camera: 5 megapixel CMOS, VGA front camera
- Display: 3", 800 x 480 pixel touchscreen, 16M TFT
- Connectivity: Wi-Fi (NO WPA-Enterprise), Bluetooth 2.1, A-GPS
- Data inputs: Capacitive Touchscreen

The LG-KM900, or LG Arena, is an LG Electronics flagship multimedia phone for Q1 2009, succeeded by the LG GD900. Announced at the Mobile World Congress on February 16, 2009, the KM900 is the first phone to feature LG’s new 3D S-Class user interface.

The S-Class is a capacitive touch-based 3D UI that lays out menus as if they were on a film reel, enabling the user to drag a finger across the reels to scroll through the available options. Its cube layout provides four home screens that can be customised with different shortcuts. The UI reacts to the orientation of the Arena, switching between portrait and landscape modes.

The Arena is a metal-cased device, available in silver, black Titanium & pink colour schemes. It has a 3-inch WVGA tempered glass multi-touch capable touchscreen with a resolution of 800 x 480 pixels.

The 5-megapixel CMOS Schneider Kreuznach camera with LED flash can record QVGA video at up to 120 frames per second, DVD resolution (720x480) at 30 frames per second or encode H.264 at 15 frames per second. It has both automatic and manual focus options. The camera is thus not as powerful as the one found on the LG Renoir.

The phone has a built in web browser, with HSDPA (7.2 Mbit/s connection) and Wi-Fi capabilities (no WPA-Enterprise). The phone also features multi-touch zooming.

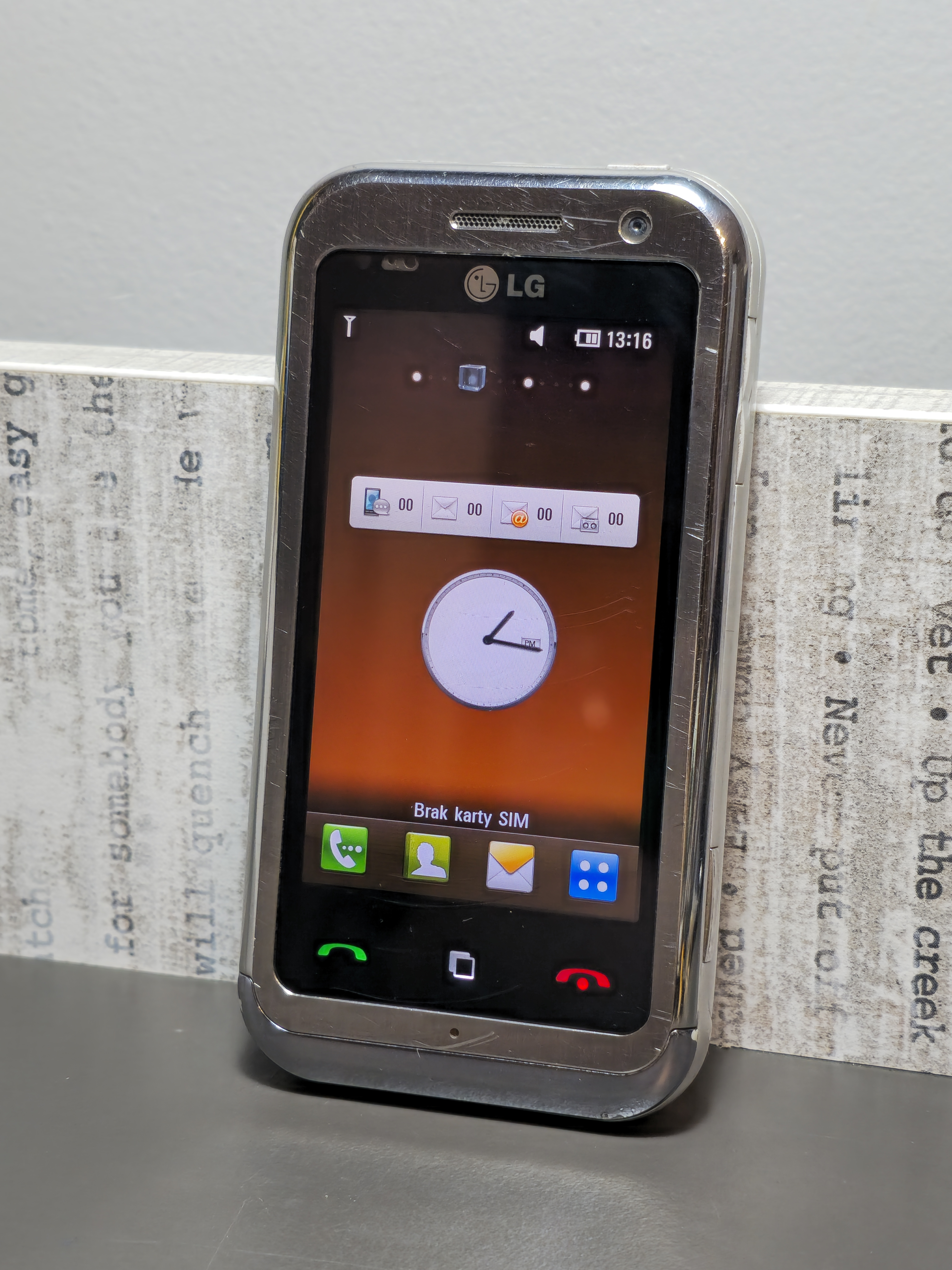
LG Arena, front side, Polish language settings

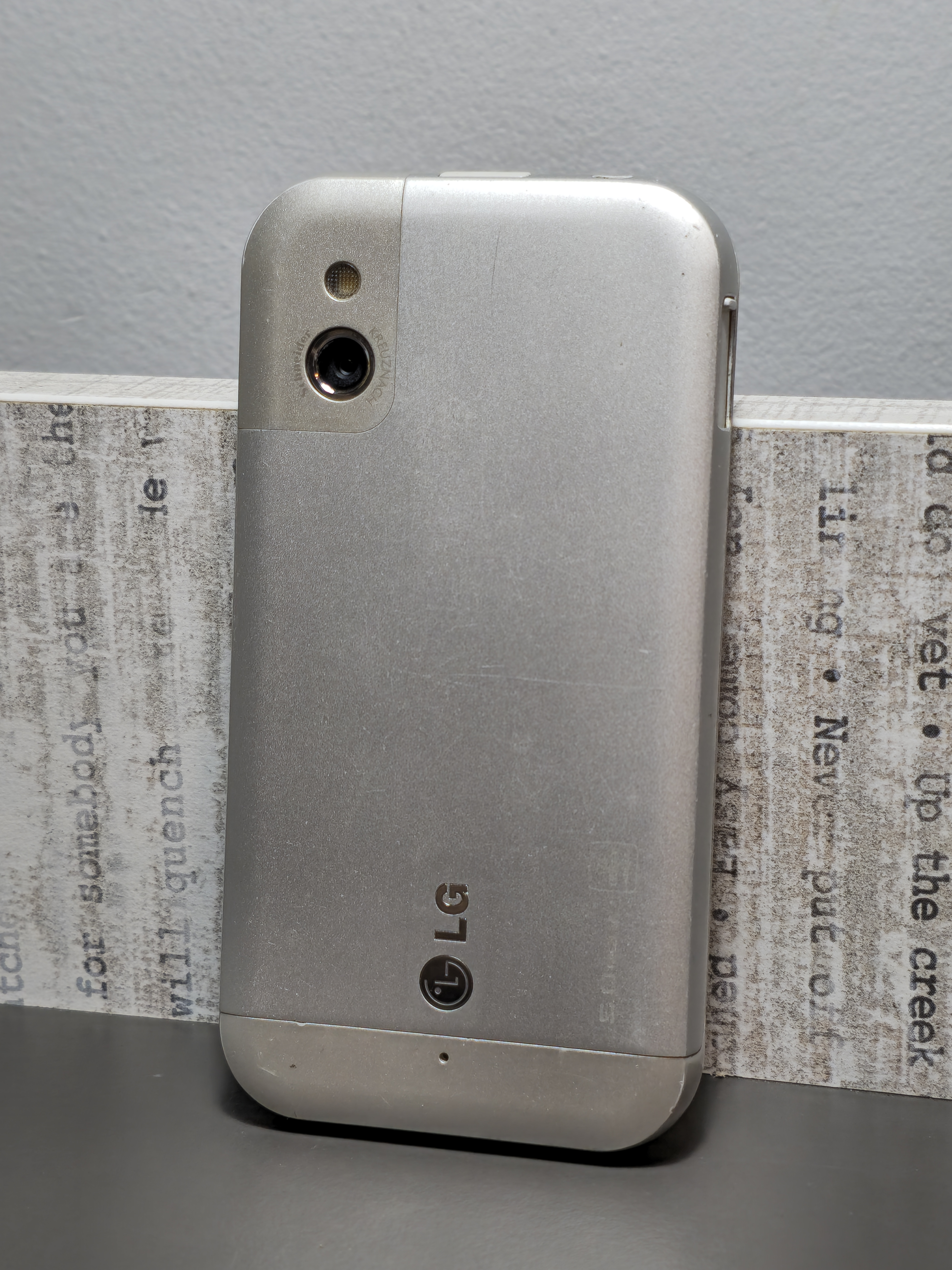
Back side

Arena is the first globally released phone to feature Dolby Mobile surround sound. Its FM transmitter can wirelessly feed into car or home stereo systems. Internal memory consists of 8 GB and there is a microSD slot that supports up to a further 32 GB.

In terms of software, Google Mobile Service which includes Google Search, Google Maps, Gmail, YouTube, and Google Blogs is embedded. However, Orange UK have removed these features from the handset.

== Firmwares ==
Although the device is compatible with both Wi-Fi and YouTube, streaming YouTube videos using a wireless network is not possible with most firmware versions, including the newest ones. Some alternative (and older) firmware versions, like V0O_02, implement the solution for this problem, but were not developed by LG and result on device's performance decrease. In September 2009 the V10P_00 version was released and updated the Google Maps version to 2.3.2, as well as using some GPS functions, making possible for the handset to find the users' location in under 5 seconds. In older firmware versions this would normally take over 1 minute.
