= GpsOne =

Phone chipset brand

gpsOne is the brand name for a cellphone chipset manufactured by Qualcomm for mobile phone tracking. It uses A-GPS or Assisted-GPS to locate the phone more quickly, accurately and reliably than by GPS alone, especially in places with poor GPS reception.

== Current uses ==
- gpsOne is primarily used today for Enhanced-911 E911 service, allowing a cell phone to relay its location to emergency dispatchers, thus overcoming one of the traditional shortcomings of cellular phone technology. Using a combination of GPS satellite signals and the cell sites themselves, gpsOne plots the location with greater accuracy than traditional GPS systems in areas where satellite reception is problematic due to buildings or terrain.
- Geotagging - addition of location information to the pictures taken with a camera phone.
- Location-based information delivery, (i.e. local weather and traffic alerts).
- Verizon Wireless formerly used gpsOne to support its VZ Navigator automotive navigation system. VZ Navigator is defunct as of 2025.
- Verizon disables gpsOne in some phones for other applications as compared to AT&T and T-Mobile. gpsOne in other systems besides Verizon can be used with any third-party applications.

== Future uses ==
Some vendors are also looking at GPS phone technology as a method of implementing location-based solutions, such as:

- Employers can track vehicles or employees, allowing quick response from the nearest representative.
- Restaurants, clubs, theatres and other venues could relay SMS special offers to patrons within a certain range.
- When using a phone as a 'wallet' and making e-payments, the user's location can be verified as an additional layer of security against cloning.
  - For example, John Doe in AverageTown USA is most likely not purchasing a candy bar from a machine at LAX if he was logged paying for the subway token in NYC, and calling his wife from the Empire State Building.
- Location-based games.

== Functions ==
gpsOne can operate in four modes:

- Standalone - The handset has no connection to the network, and uses only the GPS satellite signals it can currently receive to try to establish a location.
- Mobile Station Based (MSB) - The handset is connected to the network, and uses the GPS signals and a location signal from the network.
- Mobile Station Assisted (MSA) - The handset is connected to the network, uses GPS signals and a location signal, then relays its 'fix' to the server. Which then uses the signal strength from the phone to the network towers to further plot the user's position. Users can still maintain voice communication in this scenario, but not 'Internet/Network service', (i.e. Web browser, IM, streaming TV etc.)
- Mobile Station Hybrid - Same as above, but network functionality remains. Normally only in areas with exceptional coverage.

== Adoption ==
Since introduction in 2000, the gpsOne chipset has been adopted by 40+ vendors, and is used in more than 250 cellphone models worldwide.

More than 300 million gpsOne enabled handsets are currently on the market, making it one of the most widely deployed solutions.
