= Speakerphone =

Telephone loudspeaker

A speakerphone is a telephone with a microphone and loudspeaker provided separately from those in the handset. This device allows multiple persons to participate in a conversation. The loudspeaker broadcasts the voice or voices of those on the other end of the telephone line, while the microphone captures all voices of those using the speakerphone. The term speakerphone is also sometimes used for loudspeaker, as in "put it on speakerphone".

Many telephones have an integrated speakerphone function which can be activated by pushing a single button. This button transfers the sound input and output from the handset to the ambient microphone and loudspeaker. Devices designed specifically for speakerphone use often have multiple microphone inputs arranged radially around the device to maximize sound input, such as may occur around a conference table. The most sophisticated units allow the connection of additional satellite microphones that can be placed some distance from the main unit.

== Types of speakerphones ==
Speakerphones may be broadly divided into two classes of Duplex:

- Half-duplex
- Full-duplex

Half-duplex speakerphones allow sound to travel only in one direction at a time, either: 1) into the speakerphone from the telephone line and out of its internal speaker to its user, or 2) from its user, into the microphone, and out through the telephone line. While the users of the speakerphone are speaking, the phone only transmits sound to the telephone line; its internal speaker is cut off and no sound arriving from the telephone line can be heard by the user. While the user of the speakerphone is quiet, the speakerphone only receives sound from the telephone line and its internal speaker broadcasts that sound to its user. There is a very definite, noticeable switching action each time the phone "changes directions" and a cough or other transient noise in the room may interrupt incoming sound from the far end of the telephone connection.

Full-duplex speakerphones are able to transmit and receive simultaneously and there is no discernible change of transmission direction. These phones are much more complicated and often employ sophisticated digital signal processing algorithms to sort out the incoming sound and the sound in the room for echo cancellation. Their cost is also higher than for a half-duplex speakerphone.

== Speakerphone setup ==
Many modern speakerphones must first be calibrated to the acoustic characteristics of the room in which they will be used. During this calibration phase, they may make a variety of noises including ascending tones or chiming sounds. This calibration may be automatic or manually invoked by the user, and it may need to be repeated if the speakerphone is relocated within the room. A failure to be properly calibrated can be indicated by the occurrence of echoing, ringing sounds, or feedback.

== Handset vs. base speakerphone ==
Many cordless telephones have a handset speakerphone as well as a base speakerphone. The handset speakerphone allows hands free conversations away from the base unit. The base speakerphone is located in the base unit. The user must be at the base unit, but still gets the added benefits of having hands free conversations. Most base speakerphones have a secondary keypad for dialing calls on the base unit.

== See also ==
- Loudspeaker
