= LG Vu =

Smartphone model

LG Vu (CU915/CU920)
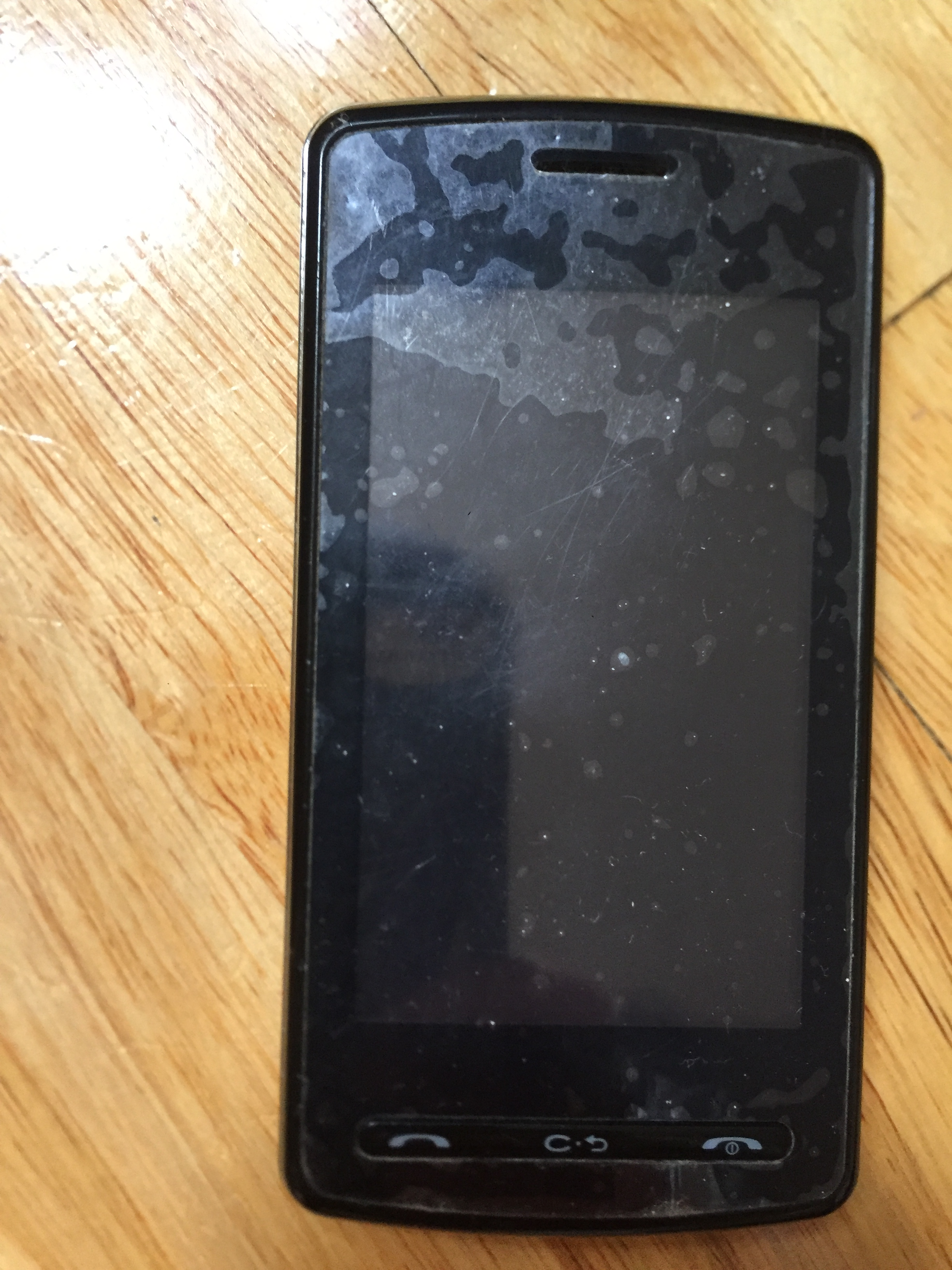
- Manufacturer: LG
- Predecessor: LG Prada
- Compatible networks: GSM, 3G
- Form factor: Bar phone
- Dimensions: 4.25” (H) x 2.16” (W) x 0.51” (D)
- Weight: 3.16 oz (90 g)
- Operating system: proprietary
- CPU: 400 MHz
- Memory: 152.7 MB
- Removable storage: microSD
- Battery: 1,000 mAh Li-Ion
- Rear camera: 2.0-megapixel with video capability
- Display: 262K Color TFT, 240 x 400 pixels, 3.00-inch (touch screen)
- Connectivity: Bluetooth 2.1
- Data inputs: Touch Screen

The LG Vu (CU915/CU920) is a touchscreen smartphone made by LG. It was released in May, 2008, almost a year after the iPhone and about four months before the first Android phone. The phone is on the AT&T network and the CU920 is capable of mobile TV. In Canada, a variant was sold under the model name TU915 by Rogers and Fido.

The Vu had a glossy plastic casing, prone to fingerprints.

== Interface ==
Most of the features on the Vu are accessed through its 3" diagonal touch screen. The phone has Call, Clear and End buttons below the screen, a volume rocker, Lock/Unlock button, and camera button along the right side. The Vu also contains haptic feedback when the touch screen is touched. Like the LG Prada, a fish or butterfly follows the touch of the user on the screen.

== User Modification ==
In addition to the general interface, users have the ability to modify the visual interface by downloading themes. The user interface may be altered to visually mimic other operating systems, such as Android or iOS.
