= Optimus UI =

User interface developed by LG Electronics

LG Optimus UI
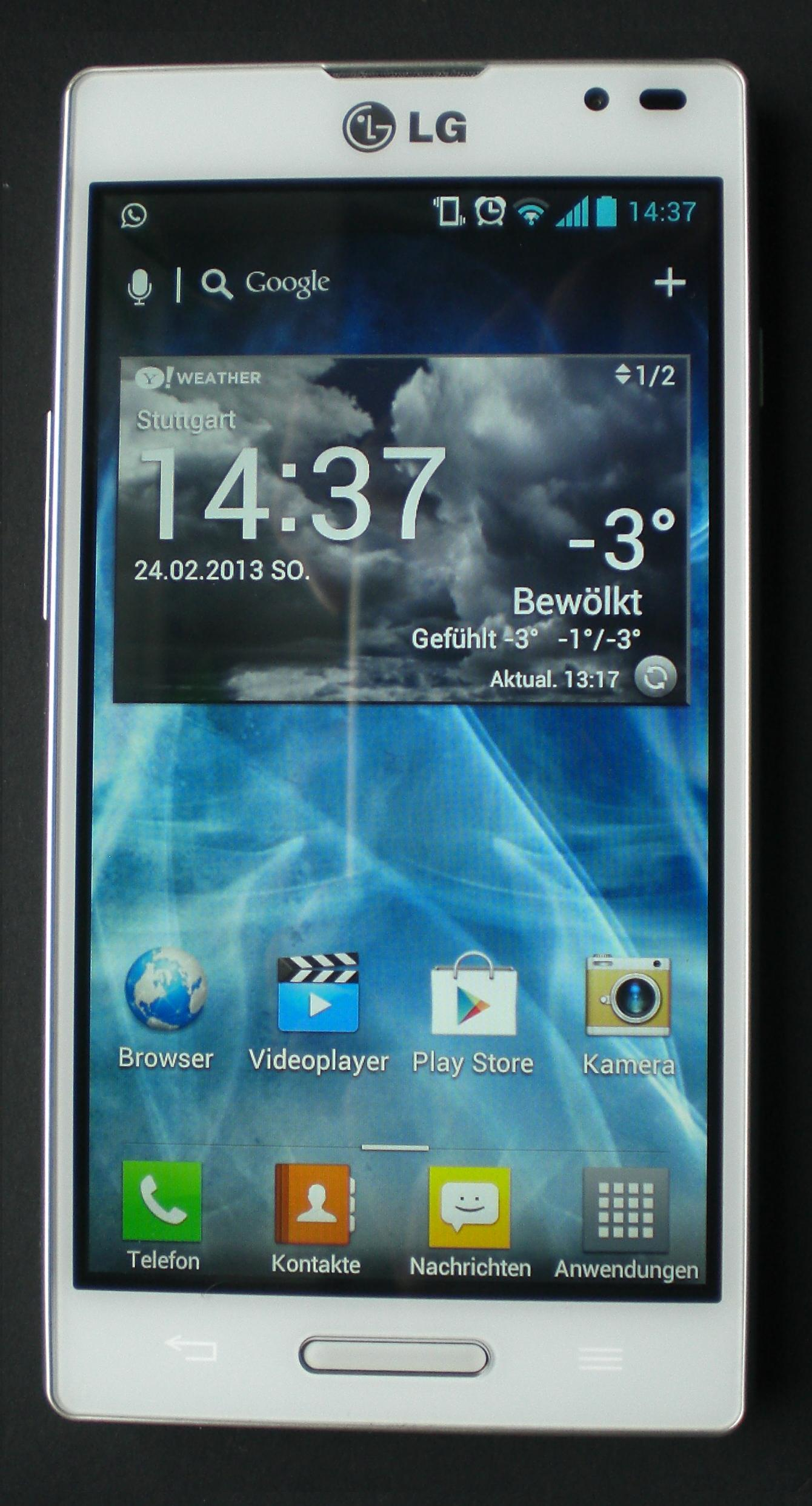
- LG Optimus L9 with Optimus UI smartphone.
- Developer: LG Electronics
- OS family: Android-like OS (Android-based Linux OS)
- Working state: Discontinued
- Source model: Open source (Modified Android Base and Main Framework) with Proprietary components (LG Apps)
- Initial release: Optimus UI 1.0 (Based on 1.5) / May 2010; 16 years ago
- Latest release: Optimus UI 5.0 (LG UX 3.0) (Based on 4.4) / May 2014; 12 years ago
- Marketing target: Alternative OS replacement for Android devices; Stock firmware for LG smartphone and tablet
- Package manager: APK-based
- Supported platforms: ARMv7, ARM64
- Kernel type: Monolithic (modified Linux kernel)
- License: Apache License 2.0; Proprietary
- Succeeded by: LG UX

Support status
- Unsupported as of August 4, 2023 (Since Android KitKat ended support for Google Play Services)

Optimus UI is a front-end touch user interface developed by LG Electronics with partners, featuring a full touch user interface. It is sometimes incorrectly identified as an operating system. Optimus UI is used internally by LG for sophisticated feature phones and tablet computers, and is not available for licensing by external parties.

The latest version of Optimus UI, 4.1.2, has been released on the Optimus K II and the Optimus Neo 3. It features a more refined user interface as compared to the previous version, 4.1.1, which would include voice shutter and quick memo.

Optimus UI is used in devices based on Android.

== Phones running LG Optimus UI ==
=== Android ===
==== Smartphones/Phablets ====
- LG GT540 Optimus
- LG Optimus Q
- LG Optimus Z
- LG Optimus One
- LG Optimus 2X
- LG Optimus 4X HD
- LG Optimus 3D
- LG Optimus 3D Max
- LG Optimus Slider
- LG Optimus LTE
- LG Optimus LTE II
- LG Optimus Vu
- LG Optimus Vu II
- LG Vu 3
- LG Optimus Black
- LG Optimus Chat
- LG Optimus Chic
- LG Optimus Net
- LG Optimus Sol
- LG Optimus HUB (E510)
- LG Optimus L1 II
- LG Optimus L3
- LG Optimus L3 II
- LG Optimus L5
- LG Optimus L5 II
- LG Optimus L7
- LG Optimus L7 II
- LG Optimus L9
- LG Optimus L9 II
- LG Optimus L90
- LG Optimus F3
- LG Optimus F3Q
- LG Optimus F5
- LG Optimus F6
- LG Optimus F7
- LG Optimus G
- LG Optimus G Pro
- LG G2
- LG G Flex
- LG G2 Mini
- LG G Pro 2
- LG G Pro Lite
- LG G3
- LG G3S
- LG G Flex 2
- LG L40 Dual
- LG L65 Dual
- LG L70 Dual
- LG L80 Dual
- LG L90 Dual
- LG Spectrum 2

==== Tablets ====
- LG Optimus Pad
- LG Optimus Pad LTE
- LG G Pad 7.0
- LG G Pad 8.3
