= LG Optimus L2 =

LG Optimus L2 E405
- Brand: LG
- Manufacturer: LG Electronics, Inc.
- Type: Smartphone
- Series: Optimus
- First released: July 2012
- Successor: LG Optimus L2 II
- Related: LG Optimus 4X HD; LG Optimus L3; LG Optimus L5; LG Optimus L7; LG Optimus L9
- Compatible networks: GSM/GPRS/EDGE; 850, 900, 1800, 1900 MHz; 3G UMTS/HSPA+ (3,6 Mbit) 900, 2100 MHz
- Form factor: Bar
- Dimensions: H 102.6mm W 61.6mm D 11.9mm
- Weight: 119 g (4 oz)
- Operating system: Android v2.3 Gingerbread
- CPU: 800MHz
- GPU: Adreno 200
- Memory: 384 MB RAM
- Storage: 1GB eMMC
- Removable storage: microSD (supports up to 32GB)
- Battery: 1,500mAh
- Rear camera: still: 3.2 MP (2048×1536) video: 640×480
- Front camera: No
- Display: 3.2-inch (240x320) TFT (125 ppi)
- Connectivity: Wi-Fi 802.11 b/g/n, Wi-Fi Hotspot, DLNA, Bluetooth 3.0 + A2DP
- Data inputs: Touch

LG Optimus L2 is a slate smartphone designed and manufactured by LG Electronics. The Optimus L2 runs on Android 2.3 Gingerbread. The LG Optimus L2 is the budget-range handset in the L series.

== Hardware ==
LG Optimus L2 comes with a dual-SIM functionality, 800 MHz single-core Qualcomm MSM7225A CPU and Adreno 200 GPU. It has a 3.2-inch TFT capacitive touch-screen, displaying 262,144 colours at QVGA resolution. Below the screen are four touch-sensitive capacitive buttons for navigating around Android (menu and back) and for the dual-SIM feature which only light up when you press them. On the front is the phone's single speaker.

== See also ==
- LG Optimus
- List of LG mobile phones
