= LG Optimus series =

Series of smartphones and tablet computers

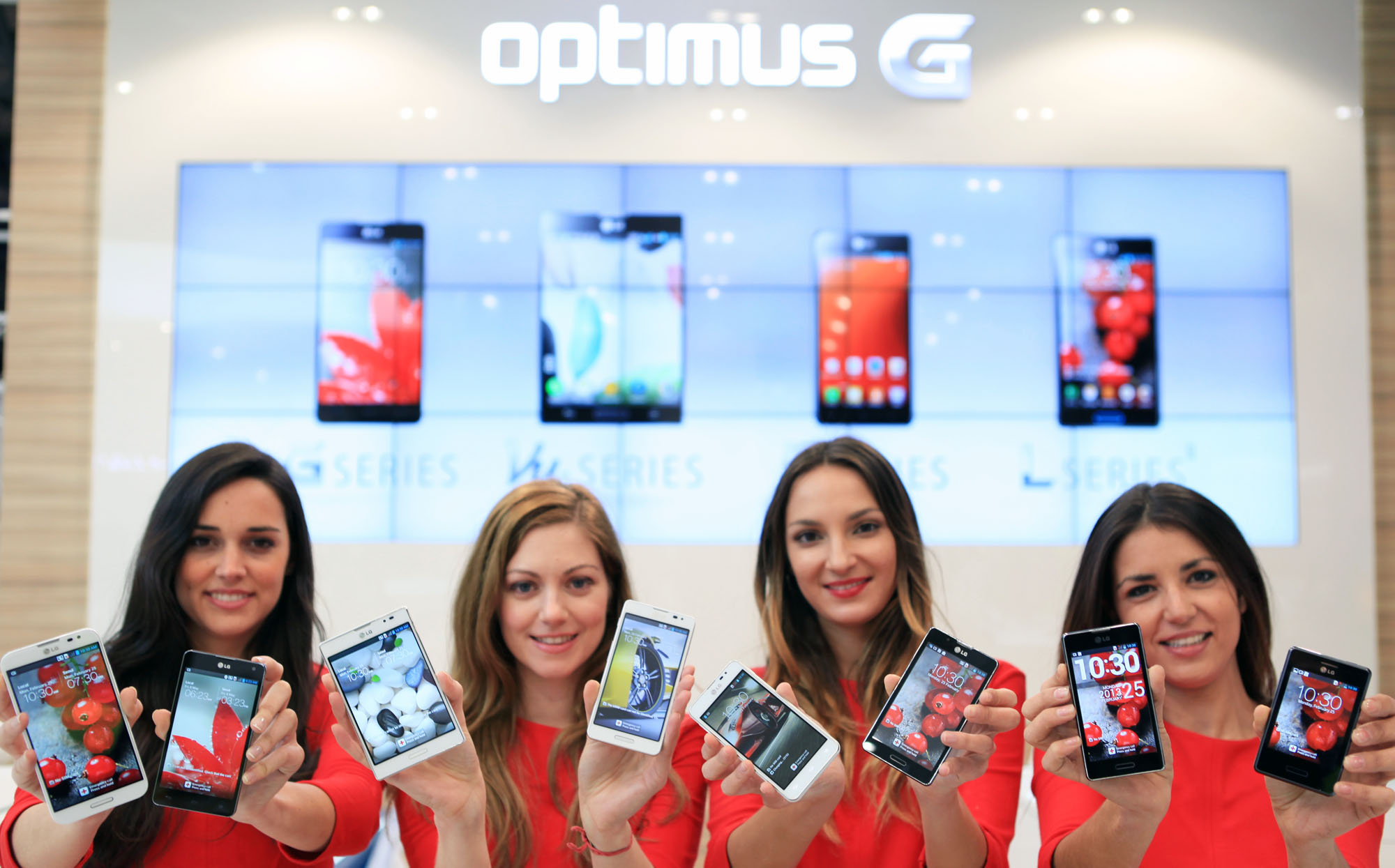
LG Optimus smartphones at Mobile World Congress 2013 in Barcelona

The LG Optimus series of smartphones and tablet computers were marketed and manufactured by LG Electronics from 2010 to 2015. Optimus-branded devices have been produced running both the Android and Windows Phone 7 operating systems.

== Android ==
- LG Optimus, alternatively titled LG Optimus GT540, LG Loop, or LG Swift
- LG Optimus Q, alternatively titled LG LU2300
- LG Optimus Pad, a tablet released in May 2011
  - LG Optimus Pad LTE, an LTE-capable successor tablet released in January 2012 in South Korea
- LG Optimus 2X, the first dual-core smartphone in the series, released in February 2011
  - LG Optimus 4X HD, a quad-core successor launched in October 2012
- LG Optimus 3D, released in July 2011
  - LG Optimus 3D Max, successor announced in Mobile World Congress 2012
- LG Optimus M
  - LG Optimus Me
- LG Optimus Zip, released by Verizon Wireless on September 22, 2011
- LG Optimus Slider, released by Virgin Mobile USA on October 17, 2011.
- LG Optimus LTE (alternatively LG Optimus True HD LTE), released in December 2011
  - LG Optimus LTE 2 was announced in May 2012, to feature 2 GB of RAM
- LG Optimus Vu, announced in February and released in March 2012
- LG Optimus G, LG's 2012 flagship phone, released in November 2012
  - LG Optimus G Pro, a larger variation on the Optimus G, featuring a 1080p display; released in March 2013 in Japan and South Korea and May 2013 in the United States

=== Optimus One ===
The LG Optimus One, released in October 2010, is LG's second phone in the Optimus series. Due to network differences between carriers, LG created a sub-series with carrier-specific variants based on the Optimus One. Over two million of the Optimus One and its carrier variants combined have been sold. Additionally, some hardware variants add minor new features:

- LG Optimus Black, released in May 2011
- LG Optimus Chat, featuring a smaller screen and a slide-out QWERTY keyboard
- LG Optimus Chic, with different hardware design plus improved digital camera and modem
- LG Optimus Net, with an improved 800 MHz single-core processor
- LG Optimus Sol, with an improved 1 GHz single-core processor

=== Optimus L ===
LG Optimus L is an Android sub-series launched in 2012. It consists of the following:

==== First Series ====
- LG Optimus L2, released in July 2012
- LG Optimus L3, released in February 2012
- LG Optimus L5, released in June 2012
- LG Optimus L7, released in July 2012
- LG Optimus L9(P769), released in October 2012
- LG Optimus L9(MS769), released in July 2013

==== Second Series ====
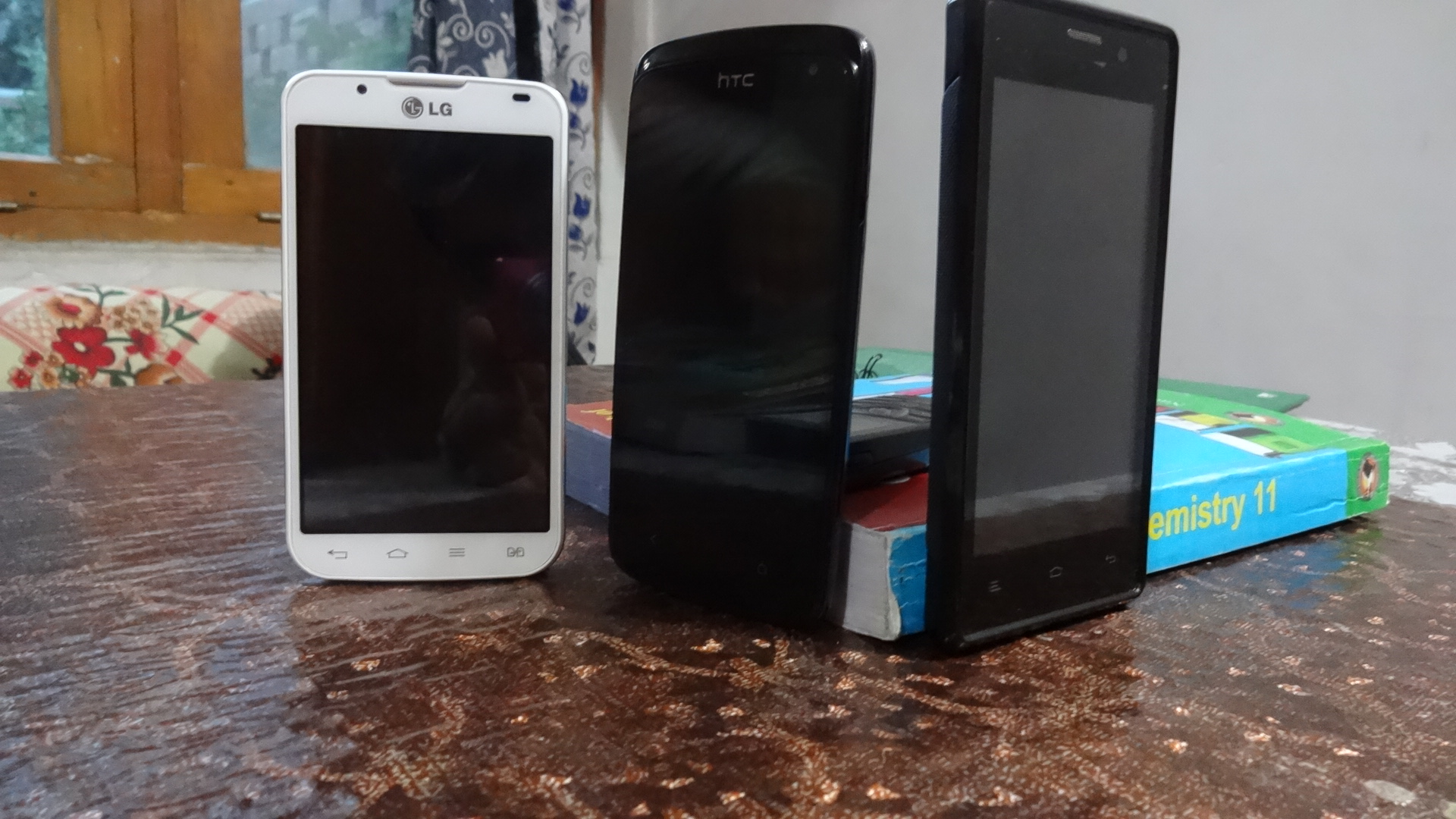
LG Optimus L7 II (P715) along with HTC Desire 500 and Qmobile Noir A500

- LG Optimus L1 II, released in April 2013
- LG Optimus L2 II, released in March 2014
- LG Optimus L3 II, released in April 2013
- LG Optimus L4 II, released in July 2013
- LG Optimus L5 II, released in April 2013
- LG Optimus L5 II Dual SIM
- LG Optimus L7 II, released in March 2013
- LG Optimus L9 II, released in October 2013

==== Third Series ====
- LG Optimus L20
- LG Optimus L30 Sporty
- LG Optimus L35
- LG Optimus L40
- LG Optimus L50 Sporty
- LG Optimus L60
- LG Optimus L65
- LG Optimus L70
- LG Optimus L80
- LG Optimus L90

And until fourth series, LG has started a new L product line.

- LG L Fino, released in September 2014
- LG L Bello, released in September 2014

=== Optimus F ===
LG Optimus F is an Android sub-series announced on February 21, 2013. It uses the same naming conventions as its predecessor, the Optimus L lineup. It includes the following:

- LG Optimus F3, released in June 2013
- LG Optimus F3Q, released in February 2014
- LG Optimus F5, released in May 2013
- LG Optimus F6, model numbers D500 and MS500, released in September 2013
- LG Optimus F7, released in June 2013
- LG F60, released in 2014
- LG F70, latest model in F series, released in 2014

=== Optimus G ===
The Optimus G sub-series was introduced for LG's high-end devices in 2012. In 2013, after releasing two devices carrying the Optimus G branding, future products (such as the LG G2) dropped the Optimus brand entirely as part of a new separate G line.

- LG Optimus G
- LG Optimus G Pro
- LG G Pro 2
- LG G2
- LG G Flex
- LG G Pad 8.3
- LG G3
- LG G Flex 2
- LG G4
- LG G5
- LG G6
- LG G7 ThinQ
- LG G8 ThinQ

=== Optimus Vu ===
The Optimus Vu sub-series was introduced for LG's stylus-enabled devices in 2012.

- LG Optimus Vu
- LG Optimus Vu II
- LG Optimus Vu III

== Windows Phone ==
LG only released two LG Optimus phones with the Windows Phone operating system, compared to 20 unique Android smartphones. The first of these was the LG Optimus 7, released in November 2010. It was followed by the LG Quantum, alternatively Optimus 7Q or Optimus Quantum, a variant with a physical keyboard.
