= LG Optimus L4 II =

Smartphone model manufactured by LG

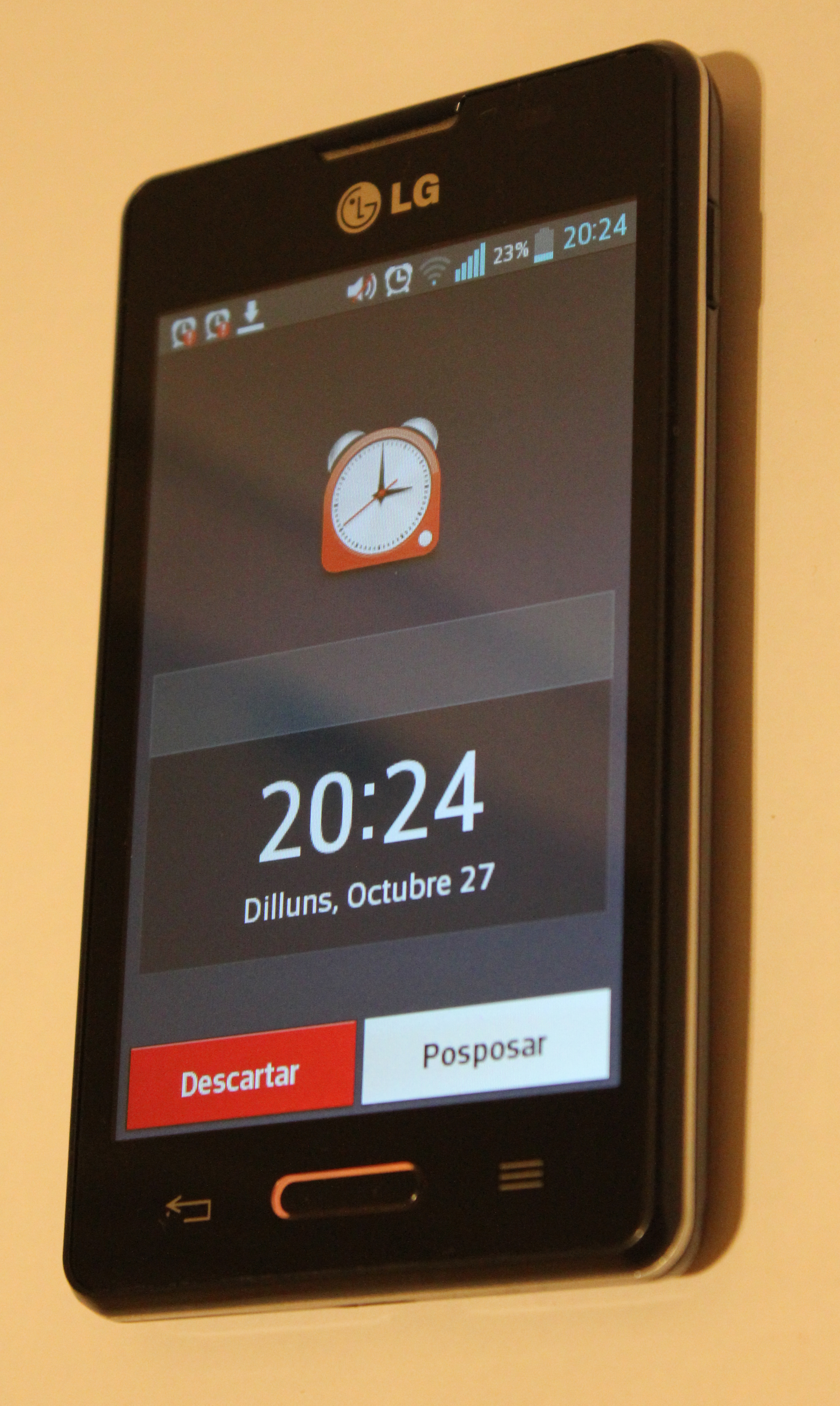
- Brand: LG
- Manufacturer: LG Electronics, Inc.
- Type: Smartphone
- Series: Optimus
- First released: 2013
- Successor: LG L50 Sporty
- Compatible networks: GSM: Quad Band (850/900/1800/1900 MHz), GPRS, UMTS, HSDPA/HSUPA 7,2 Mbps, GPS
- Dimensions: 64,7 x 112,5 x 11,9 mm
- Weight: 125 g (4 oz)
- Operating system: Android 4.1.2 (Jelly Bean)
- CPU: Mediatek MT6575, 1 GHz single-core
- Memory: 512 MB
- Storage: 4 GB
- Removable storage: microSDHC, 32 GB maximum
- Battery: Li-ion 1700 mAh
- Rear camera: 3,15 megapixel
- Display: 3,8" 320x480 pixel
- Connectivity: Wi-Fi 802.11 b/g/n, Bluetooth 3.0
- Data inputs: Fibreglass capacitive touch

LG Optimus L4 II is a smartphone designed and manufactured by LG Electronics. It is a part of the second generation of the product range called LG L-Style (advertised with Optimus L1 II, Optimus L3 II, Optimus L5 II, Optimus L7 II and Optimus L9 II.

It was released on June 16, 2013. Operating system is Android 4.1.2 Jelly Bean.

== Features ==
Optimus L4 II is a mid-range device, no special features, and the launch price was 129 euro. It has the Optimus LG user interface.

The processor is a Mediatek 6575 1 GHz single core processor with 512 MB of RAM and 4 GB of internal memory, which can be increased by memory cards microSD and microSDHC up to 32 GB.

The screen is a 3.8in HVGA, with resolution 320x480 pixels (about 160 dpi), made with IPS technology. It is equipped with Wi-Fi and Bluetooth connectivity, and a battery of 1700 mAh or 2150 mAh.

== See also ==
- Android
- Google
- LG Optimus
- LG Optimus L1 II
- LG Optimus L3 II
- LG Optimus L5 II
- LG Optimus L7 II
- LG Optimus L9 II
