= LG G Pad 8.0 =

2014 Android tablet computer

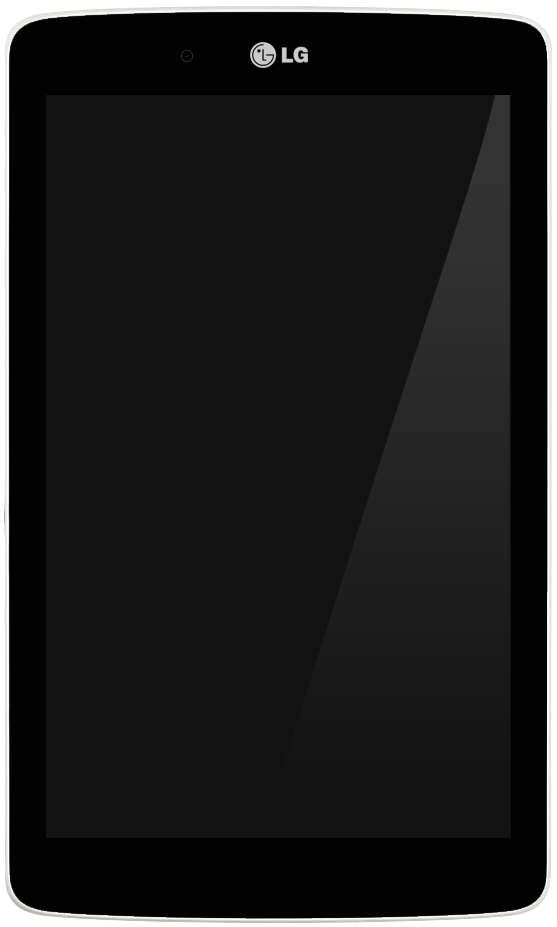
- LG G Pad 8.0 in White back
- Also known as: V480; V490
- Manufacturer: LG Electronics
- Product family: LG G series
- Type: Tablet, media player, PC
- Released: Q2 2014
- Operating system: Android 4.4.2 "KitKat"; Upgradeable to Android 5.0.2 "Lollipop"
- CPU: quad-core processor
- Memory: 1 GB
- Storage: 16 GB flash memory, microSDXC slot (up to 64 GB)
- Display: 1280x800 px, 8.0 in (20 cm) diagonal, IPS LCD; 283 ppi; 107 ppcm)
- Input: Multi-touch screen, digital compass, proximity and ambient light sensors, accelerometer
- Camera: rear-facing, front-facing
- Connectivity: HSPA+ 21, 5.76 Mbit/s quad 850, 900, 1,900, 2,100 MHz; EDGE/GPRS Quad 850, 900, 1,800, 1,900 MHz; Wi-Fi 802.11a/b/g/n (2.4, 5 GHz), Bluetooth 3.0, HDMI (external cable)
- Predecessor: LG G Pad 8.3
- Related: LG G Pad 7.0; LG G Pad 10.1

The LG G Pad 8.0 (also known as LG G Tab 8.0) is an 8.0-inch Android-based tablet computer produced and marketed by LG Electronics. It belongs to the LG G series, and was announced on 13 May 2014 along with the G Pad 7.0, and G Pad 10.1. This is one of LG's new tablet size variants aimed to compete directly with the Samsung Galaxy Tab 4 series.

== History ==
The G Pad 8.0 was first announced on 13 May 2014. It was officially unveiled at the MedPI tradeshow in Monaco. It was released in July 2014.

== Features ==
The G Pad 8.0 is released with Android 4.4.2 Kitkat. LG has customized the interface with its Optimus UI software. As well as apps from Google, including Google Play, Gmail and YouTube, it has access to LG apps such as QPair, QSlide, KnockOn, and Slide Aside.

The G Pad 8.0 is available in a Wi-Fi-only, 3G & Wi-Fi, and 4G/LTE & Wi-Fi variants. Internal storage is 16 GB, with a microSDXC card slot for expansion. It has an 8.0-inch IPS LCD screen with a resolution of 1280x800 pixel. It also features a front camera without flash and rear-facing camera. It also has the ability to record HD videos.
