= LG G Pad 10.1 =

Model of tablet computer

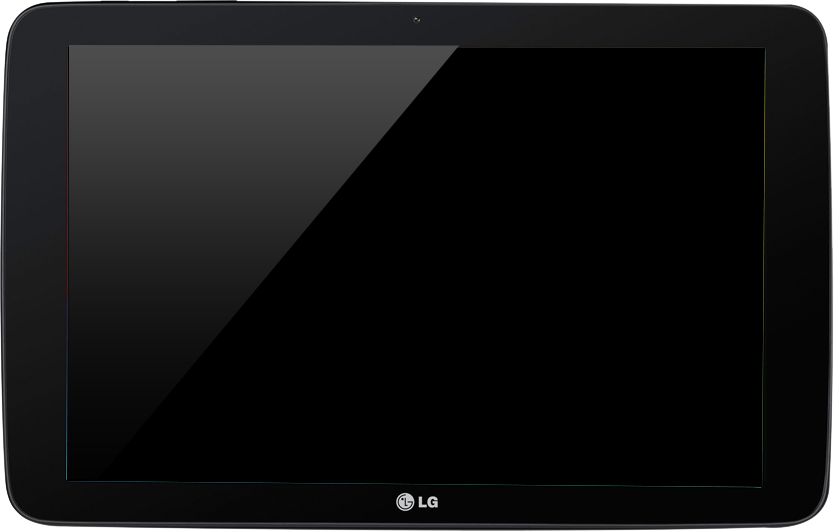
- LG G Pad 10.1
- Also known as: VK700
- Manufacturer: LG Electronics
- Product family: LG G series
- Type: Tablet, media player, PC
- Released: July 2014
- Operating system: Android 4.4.2 "KitKat"; Upgradeable to Android 5.0.2 "Lollipop"
- CPU: 1.2 GHz Qualcomm Snapdragon 400
- Memory: 1 GB
- Storage: 16 GB flash memory, microSDXC slot (up to 64 GB)
- Display: 1280×800 px, 10.1 in (26 cm) diagonal, IPS LCD (149ppi)
- Graphics: Adreno 320
- Input: Multi-touch screen, digital compass, proximity and ambient light sensors, accelerometer
- Camera: 5.0 MP AF rear-facing, 1.3 MP front-facing
- Connectivity: HSPA+ 21, 5.76 Mbit/s quad 850, 900, 1,900, 2,100 MHz EDGE/GPRS Quad 850, 900, 1,800, 1,900 MHz Wi-Fi 802.11a/b/g/n (2.4, 5 GHz), Bluetooth 3.0, HDMI (external cable)
- Dimensions: 260.9 mm (10.27 in) H 165.9 mm (6.53 in) W 8.9 mm (0.35 in) D
- Weight: 523 g (1.153 lb)
- Predecessor: LG G Pad 8.3
- Related: LG G Pad 7.0; LG G Pad 8.0

The LG G Pad 10.1 (also known as LG G Tab 10.1) is a 10.1-inch Android-based tablet computer produced and marketed by LG Electronics. It belongs to the LG G series, and was announced on 13 May 2014 along with the G Pad 8.0, and G Pad 7.0. It was one of LG's tablet-size variants aimed to compete directly with the Samsung Galaxy Tab 4 series.

== History ==
The G Pad 10.1 was first announced on 13 May 2014. It was officially unveiled at the MedPI tradeshow in Monaco. It was released in July 2014.

== Features ==
The G Pad 10.1 was released with Android 4.4.2 Kitkat. LG has customized the interface with its Optimus UI software. As well as apps from Google, including Google Play, Gmail and YouTube, it has access to LG apps such as QPair, QSlide, KnockOn, and Slide Aside.

The G Pad 10.1 is available in a WiFi-only, 3G & Wi-Fi, and 4G/LTE & WiFi variants. Internal storage is 16 GB, with a microSDXC card slot for expansion. It has a 10.1-inch IPS LCD screen with a resolution of 1280x800 pixel. It also features a front camera without flash and rear-facing camera. It also has the ability to record HD videos.
