= LG Optimus Pad LTE =

Android tablet developed by LG Electronics

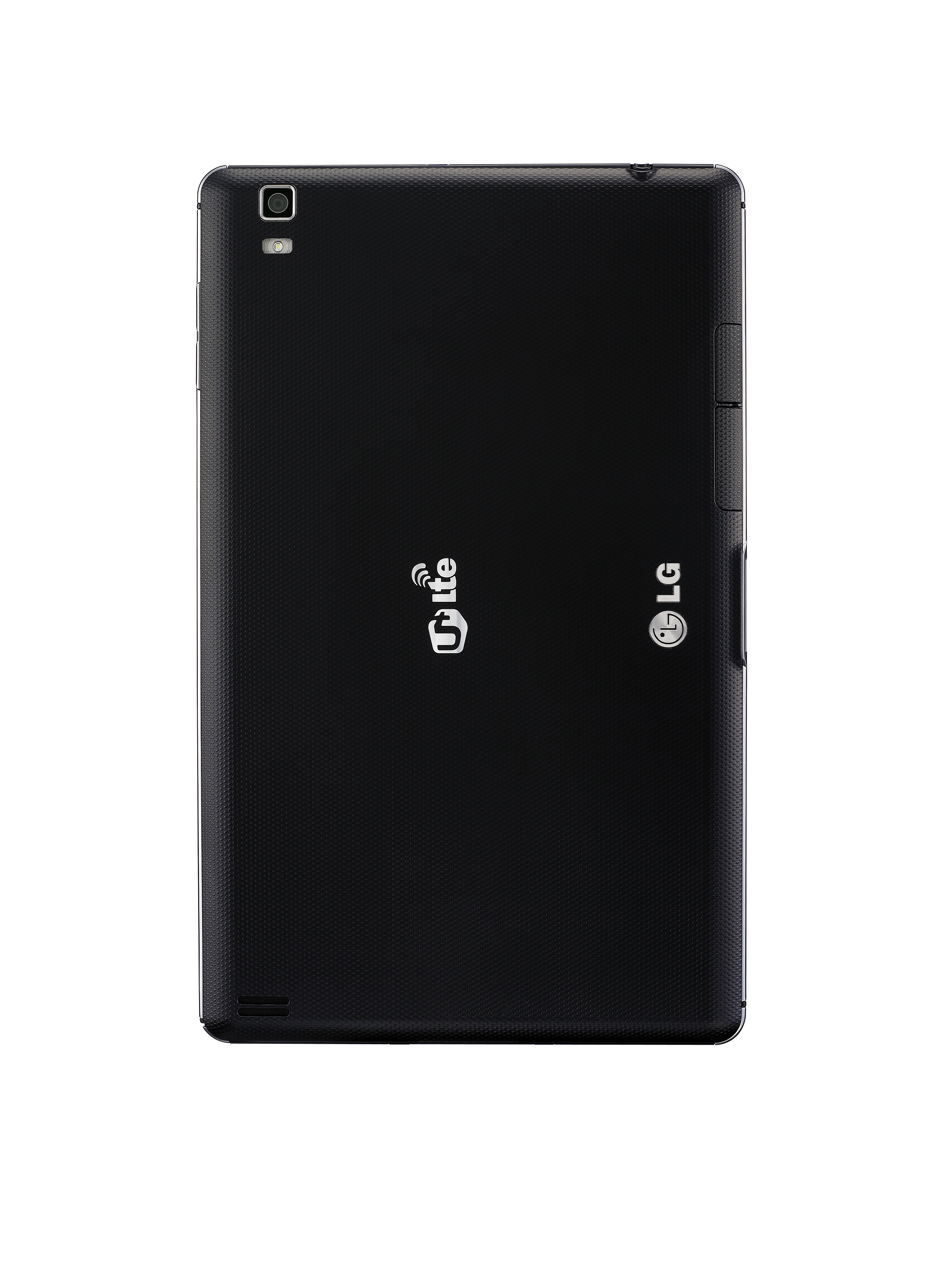
- Manufacturer: LG Electronics
- Product family: LG Optimus
- Type: Tablet media player
- Released: January 2012 (KR)
- Operating system: Android 3.2 "Honeycomb" may upgradable to Android 4.1.2 "Jelly Bean"
- CPU: 1.5 GHz Qualcomm dual-core processor
- Storage: Flash memory: 32 GB
- Display: 8.9 in (23 cm) 1280×768 px at 168 ppi
- Input: Multi-touch capacitive touchscreen display 3-axis gyroscope 3-axis accelerometer Digital compass Ambient light sensor
- Camera: 8.0 megapixel rear-facing 3D camera with LED Flash and 1080p video capture 2.0 megapixel front-facing camera
- Connectivity: Wi-Fi 802.11b/g/n and Bluetooth 2.1+EDR
- Power: 6800 mAh
- Dimensions: 243 mm (9.6 in) (h); 149.4 mm (5.88 in) (w); 12.8 mm (0.50 in) (d)
- Weight: 630 g (22 oz)
- Predecessor: LG Optimus Pad
- Successor: LG G Pad 8.3
- Website: Optimus Pad LTE website

The LG Optimus Pad LTE is a tablet computer developed by LG Electronics as a direct successor to the original LG Optimus Pad released in South Korea in January 2012. The LG Optimus Pad LTE was planned to be released worldwide but was cancelled due to its lackluster sales in its domestic market and mixed-to-negative reception towards the device leaving LG to withdraw in the tablet making for a brief period in the world market before the release of its successor the LG G Pad 8.3.

== Features ==
The LG Optimus Pad LTE has a 2MP front-facing camera and a 8MP rear-facing camera. Like its predecessor, it features an 8.9-inch touchscreen that includes Wi-Fi 802.11b/g/n and Bluetooth 2.1 and is powered by a 6800 mAh Li-Ion which runs on a 1.5 GHz Qualcomm dual-core chipset and Android 3.2 Honeycomb with Optimus UI. And may be upgradable to Android 4.1.2 Jelly Bean with CyanogenMod and Optimus UI

== See also ==
- LG Optimus Pad The predecessor to the LG Optimus Pad LTE
- LG G Pad 8.3 The successor to the LG Optimus Pad LTE
