= LG Optimus Pad =

Android tablet developed by LG Electronics

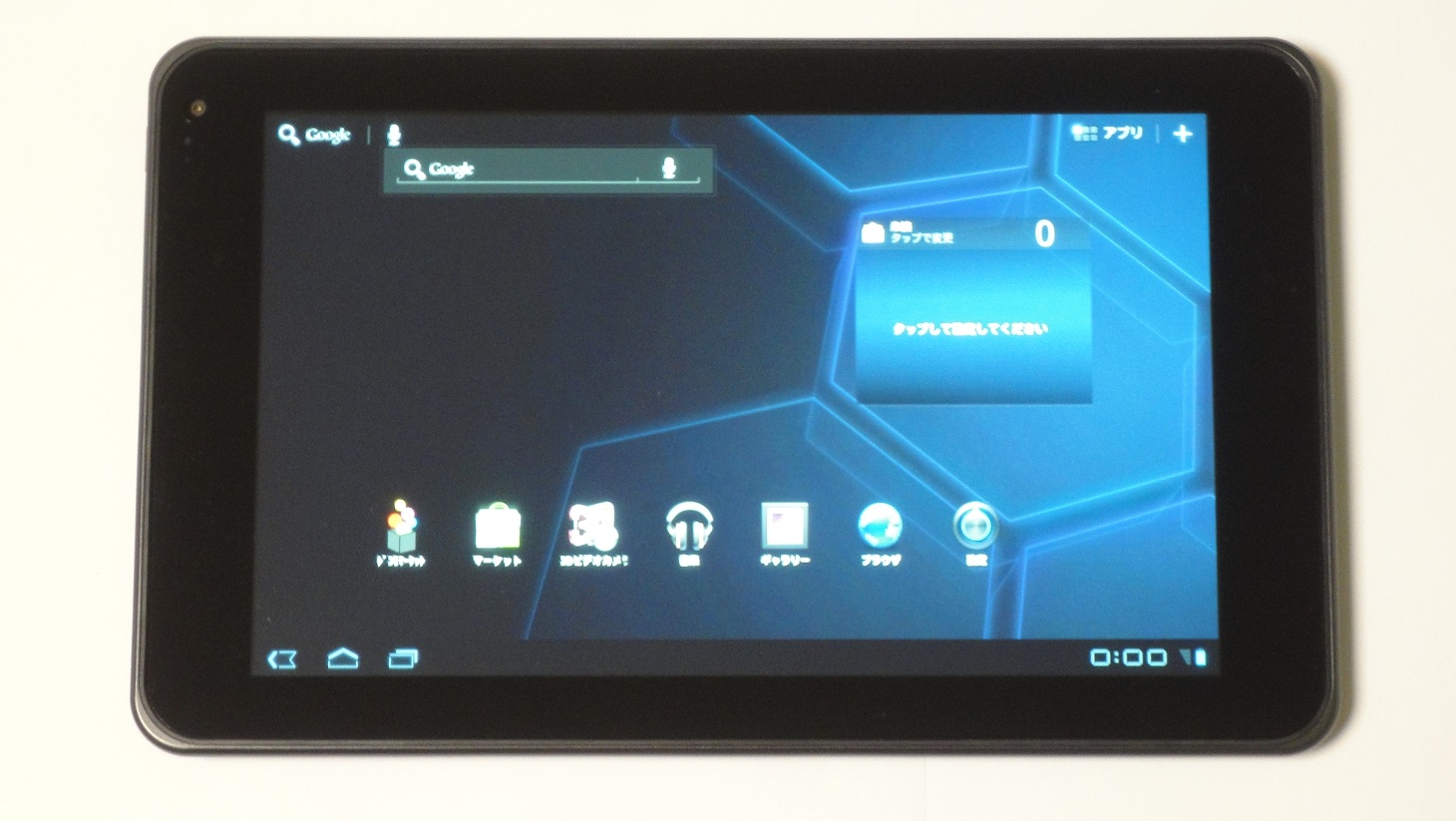
- The LG Optimus Pad V900
- Manufacturer: LG Electronics
- Product family: LG Optimus
- Type: Tablet media player
- Released: March 2011 (US); April 2011 (KR)
- Operating system: Android 3.0 "Honeycomb" (tablets) may upgradable to Android 4.1.2 "Jelly Bean" with CyanogenMod
- CPU: 1GHz Nvidia Tegra 2 AP20H dual-core processor
- Memory: 1 GB RAM
- Storage: Flash memory: 32 GB
- Display: 8.9 in (23 cm) 1280×768 px at 168 ppi
- Input: Multi-touch capacitive touchscreen display 3-axis gyroscope 3-axis accelerometer Digital compass Ambient light sensor
- Camera: 5.0 megapixel rear-facing 3D camera with LED Flash and 1080p video capture 2.0 megapixel front-facing camera
- Connectivity: Wi-Fi 802.11b/g/n and Bluetooth 2.1+EDR
- Power: 6400 mAh
- Dimensions: 243 mm (9.6 in) (h); 149.4 mm (5.88 in) (w); 12.8 mm (0.50 in) (d)
- Weight: 630 g (22 oz)
- Successor: LG Optimus Pad LTE

The LG Optimus Pad is a tablet computer developed by LG Electronics for its own line-up and for specific mobile carriers in selected countries. Mobile carriers include NTT DoCoMo and T-Mobile which unlike its domestic rival, Samsung offering the same tablet model for specific carriers, LG does not alter the specs of those they release to these carriers and the only alteration is on the addition of the mobile carriers logo on it. The LG Optimus Pad was first released in South Korea in April 2011 and then in the US in March 2011 which is also known as the T-Mobile G-Slate. It is LG's first device running Android 3.0 ("Honeycomb") and appeared at the Mobile World Congress in February 2011.

== Features ==
The LG Optimus Pad has a 2MP front-facing camera and a 5MP rear-facing camera. It features an 8.9-inch touchscreen that includes Wi-Fi 802.11b/g/n and Bluetooth 2.1 and is powered by a 6400 mAh Li-Ion which runs on a 1 GHz Nvidia Tegra 2 processor and Android 3.0 Honeycomb with Optimus UI.

== Critics ==
The tablet has been criticised for the lack of updates provided by LG and for locking the bootloader with the first update it got without notifying users.

While its competitors like Motorola Xoom were usually updated at least to Android 4.0.3 Ice Cream Sandwich and mostly even to Android 4.1 Jelly Bean, LG only gave its G-Slate 2 minor updates and wasn't even able to release an important version 3.2 Honeycomb which should be theoretically simple for LG to make and would improve compatibility with apps, stability and extend functionality.

Because of this and closed drivers the Android community was not able to make a fully functional ICS or Jelly Bean ROM - most importantly camera can't be used with those builds.

Latest official ROM was released in March 2012 and unofficial ROM was officially abandoned in January 2013.

== See also ==
- LG Optimus Pad LTE The first successor to the LG Optimus Pad
- LG G Pad 8.3 The second successor to the LG Optimus Pad
