= LG Optimus L70 =

Android smartphone designed and manufactured by LG Electronics

LG Optimus L70i
- Brand: LG
- Manufacturer: LG Electronics, Inc.
- Type: Smartphone
- Series: Optimus
- First released: 2014, April
- Compatible networks: 2G GSM/GPRS/EDGE; 850, 900, 1800, 1900 MHz; 3G UMTS/HSPA+ (5.76 Mbit) 900, 2100 MHz
- Form factor: Bar
- Dimensions: H 127.2mm W 66.8mm D 9.5mm
- Weight: 124 g (4 oz)
- Operating system: Android 4.4.2 KitKat; Custom firmware versions: Android Lollipop: CyanogenMod 12-12.1; Android Marshmallow: CyanogenMod 13; Android Nougat 7.1.2: LineageOS 14.1
- System-on-chip: Qualcomm Snapdragon 200 (MSM8210)
- CPU: Dual-core 1.2 GHz ARM Cortex-A7
- GPU: Adreno 302
- Memory: 1 GB RAM
- Storage: 4 GB
- Removable storage: microSD (supports up to 32GB)
- Battery: Cricket Wireless: 2100 mAh; MetroPCS: 2040 mAh
- Rear camera: 5.0 MP
- Front camera: VGA
- Display: 4.5 in (110 mm) diagonal IPS LCD 480×800 pixels, 16M colors, 207 ppi pixel density
- Connectivity: Wi-Fi 802.11 /b/g/n, Wi-Fi Hotspot, DLNA; Bluetooth 4.0, A2DP, BLE; 3.5mm stereo audio jack microUSB 2.0 port
- Model: Cricket Wireless: D321; MetroPCS: MS323

LG Optimus L70 is a slate smartphone designed and manufactured by LG Electronics. The LG L70 is the mid-range handset in the L series.

== Specifications ==
=== Design ===
The LG Optimus L70 has a 4.5-inch display with sizable bezels; the upper bezel houses the earpiece, an "LG" logo, the sensors and the front-facing camera while the lower bezel houses the physical home button, and the capacitive back and menu buttons. On the side frame; there is a volume rocker at the left, a power button at the right, a headphone jack at the top and a microUSB port at the bottom. The rear-facing camera coupled with an LED flash and the speaker are located at the back. The back cover has an "LG" logo and is removable. Depending on the model, the phone has Corning Gorilla Glass 2 (Cricket Wireless) or 3 (MetroPCS) protective glass.

=== Hardware ===
The LG Optimus L70 features a Qualcomm Snapdragon 200 (MSM8210) system-on-chip with an ARM Cortex-A7 dual-core CPU clocked at 1.2 GHz and an Adreno 302 GPU. The LG L70 has 1 GB of RAM and 4 GB of internal storage which can be expanded via a microSD card up to 32 GB. The phone features a 4.5" IPS LCD with 480×800 pixels resolution, 16M colors and ~207 ppi pixel density. The LG L70 has a 5 MP rear camera paired with a single LED flash, and a VGA front-facing camera; both of the cameras are capable of 480p video recording at 30 fps. The LG L70 is powered by a 2040 mAh (MetroPCS) or a 2100 mAh (Cricket Wireless) removable standard lithium-ion battery.

=== Software ===
The LG Optimus L70 is shipped with Android 4.4.2 KitKat. It is upgradeable to Android Lollipop, Marshmallow and Nougat through CyanogenMod. It also received Android 7.1.2 Nougat from LineageOS.

== See also ==
- LG Optimus
- List of LG mobile phones
