= LG G Pad 7.0 =

2014 Android tablet computer

- Also known as: V400, V410
- Manufacturer: LG Electronics
- Product family: LG G series
- Type: Tablet, media player, PC
- Released: Q2 2014
- Operating system: Android 4.4.2 "KitKat"; Upgradeable to Android 5.0.2 "Lollipop"
- CPU: 1.2 GHz quad-core Qualcomm MSM8226 Snapdragon 400 processor
- Memory: 1 GB
- Storage: 8 GB flash memory, microSDXC slot (up to 64 GB), 16GB flash memory (v410)
- Display: 1280x800 px, 7.0 in (18 cm) diagonal, IPS LCD (216 ppi)
- Graphics: Qualcomm Adreno 305
- Input: Multi-touch screen, digital compass, proximity and ambient light sensors, accelerometer
- Camera: rear-facing, front-facing
- Connectivity: LTE Band 1,2,4,5,17 700/850/1700/1900/2100 MHz (v410 model only); HSPA+ 21, 5.76 Mbit/s quad 850, 900, 1,900, 2,100 MHz; EDGE/GPRS Quad 850, 900, 1,800, 1,900 MHz; Wi-Fi 802.11a/b/g/n (2.4, 5 GHz), Bluetooth 3.0, HDMI (external cable)
- Dimensions: 189.3 x 113.8 x 10.1 mm (7.45 x 4.48 x 0.40 in
- Weight: 293 g (10.34 oz)
- Predecessor: LG G Pad 8.3
- Related: LG G Pad 8.0; LG G Pad 10.1

The LG G Pad 7.0 (also known as LG G Tab 7.0) is a 7.0-inch Android-based tablet computer produced and marketed by LG Electronics. It belongs to the LG G series, and was announced on 13 May 2014 along with the G Pad 8.0, and G Pad 10.1.

== History ==
The G Pad 7.0 was first announced on 13 May 2014. It was officially unveiled at the MedPI tradeshow in Monaco. It was officially released in July 2014.

== Features ==
The G Pad 7.0 is released with Android 4.4.2 Kitkat. LG has customized the interface with its Optimus UI software. As well as apps from Google, including Google Play, Gmail and YouTube, it has access to LG apps such as QPair, QSlide, KnockOn, and Slide Aside.

The G Pad 7.0 is available in a WiFi-only, 3G & Wi-Fi, and 4G/LTE & WiFi variants. Internal storage is 8 GB (16 GB for v410 LTE), with a microSDXC card slot for expansion. It has a 7.0-inch IPS LCD screen with a resolution of 1280x800 pixel. It also features a front camera without flash and rear-facing camera. It also has the ability to record HD videos.
