= LG Optimus 2X =

Smartphone designed and manufactured by LG Electronics

LG Optimus 2X LG Optimus Dual LG Optimus Speed T-Mobile G2X
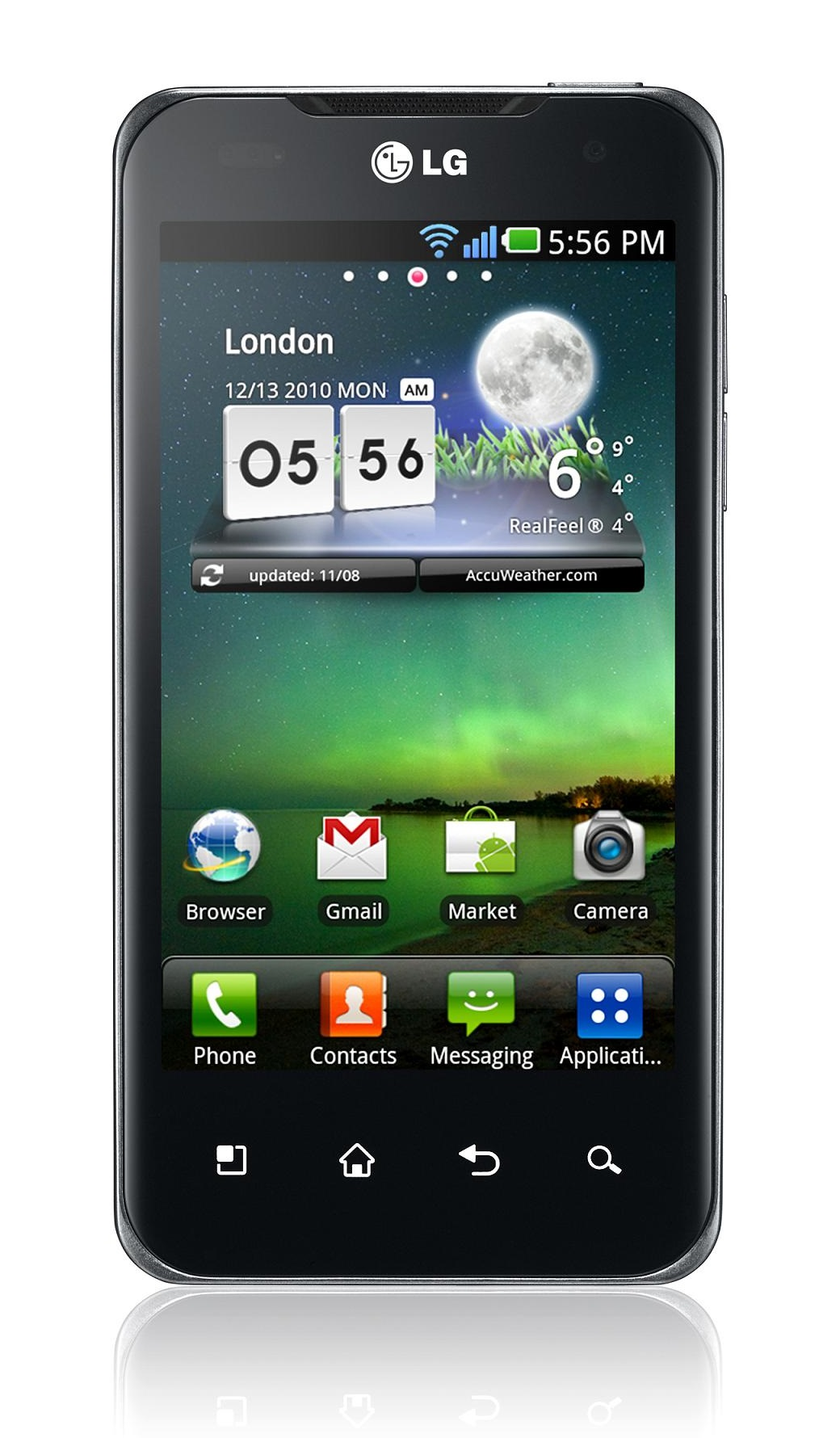
- Manufacturer: LG Electronics, Inc.
- Type: Smartphone
- Series: Optimus
- First released: South Korea, February 2011 (SK Telecom)
- Predecessor: LG Optimus One
- Successor: LG Prada 3.0; LG Optimus 4X HD
- Related: LG Optimus 3D; LG Optimus Black myTouch/myTouch Q by LG; LG Optimus LTE
- Compatible networks: GSM/GPRS/EDGE Quad-band (850, 900, 1,800, and 1,900 MHz); HSPA Tri-band (900, 1700/AWS [P999/T-Mobile USA Only] 1900, and 2100 MHz); HSDPA 10.2 Mbit/s; HSUPA 5.76 Mbit/s
- Form factor: Bar
- Dimensions: 123.9 mm (4.88 in) H 63.2 mm (2.49 in) W 10.9 mm (0.43 in) D
- Weight: 128 g (4.5 oz)
- Operating system: Android 2.2.2 upgradeable to Android 2.3.4 (P999) and Android 4.0.4 (P990 & SU660)
- CPU: Nvidia Tegra 2 Series AP20H
- GPU: ULP GeForce
- Memory: 512 MB RAM (of which 128 MB is dedicated to the GPU)
- Storage: 8 GB internal storage (User Accessible : 6.4 GB)
- Removable storage: microSD (supports up to 32 GB)
- Battery: 1.5Ah, 3.7V, 5.5Wh; Internal Rechargeable Li-ion; User replaceable
- Rear camera: 8.0 MP; Autofocus; LED flash Video : 1080p at 24 fps, 720p at 30 fps
- Front camera: 1.3 MP
- Display: TFT LCD, 4.0 in (100 mm) diagonal 480×800 px WVGA (233 ppi)
- Connectivity: 3.5 mm TRRS; Bluetooth 2.1 + EDR with A2DP; DLNA; FM stereo receiver HDMI Type D micro USB 2.0; Wi-Fi 802.11b/g/n
- Data inputs: Multi-touch capacitive touchscreen A-GPS; Accelerometer; Ambient light sensor Gyroscope; Magnetometer; Proximity sensor

The LG Optimus 2X is a smartphone designed and manufactured by LG Electronics. The Optimus 2X is the world's first smartphone with a dual-core processor and the third phone in the LG Optimus-Android series. LG introduced the Optimus 2X on December 16, 2010 and the device first became available to consumers in South Korea in January 2011. It was also launched in Singapore on March 3, 2011. The Optimus 2X has run the Android 2.3 software version since the upgrade in November 2011, but the latest offering is Android 4.0. At the time, the phone held the record for the longest update holdout, taking 16 months to receive a firmware update from Android 2.2 to 2.3.

== Hardware ==
The LG Optimus 2X holds the Guinness World Record as the first mobile phone to use a dual-core processor. It is the first smartphone to feature the Nvidia Tegra 2, a dual-core processor clocked at 1 GHz or 1.2 GHz. It also has a micro HDMI port and an 8-megapixel camera. The Optimus 2X is capable of HD playback through the micro HDMI port when connected to an HD device, such as an HDTV.

=== Display ===
The LG Optimus 2X has a 4-inch LCD IPS capacitive touch-screen, displaying 16.7 million colours at 480×800 pixels.

=== Storage & Memory ===
The LG Optimus 2X has a card slot for additional memory. It supports a microSD card of up to 32 GB capacity. It has up to 8 GB of internal memory storage and 512 MB RAM (384 MB available) or 1 GB RAM (496 MB available).

=== Camera ===
An 8-megapixel camera is included on the Optimus 2X and is capable of 3264x2448 pixels. The camera includes auto focus and a LED flash. A secondary front-facing 1.3-megapixel camera is located on the front of the device but it cannot make use of the LED flash on the back of the phone. The primary camera is capable of video recording of 1080p at 24 fps, or 720p at 30 fps.

== Modifications ==
The aftermarket Android firmware Cyanogenmod has been developed for the Optimus 2X. Official CyanogenMod support was added in CyanogenMod 7.1.

== History ==
LG previewed the Optimus 2X under the device's internal development name, "LG Star", at CES 2011.

== Naming variations ==
- LG Optimus Speed
- LG Optimus 2X / LG Optimus Dual / LG P990 / LGP990h / LG P990hn (h and hn models supported different frequencies)
- T-Mobile G2X / LG P999
- LG Star (platform name)
- LG Star Dop (platform name)
- Optimus 2X SU660 - different ROM (kernel patched) and software revision than P990. SU660 has 3 buttons on the bottom (P990 has 4 buttons)

== See also ==
- LG Optimus
- List of LG mobile phones
- Galaxy Nexus

Other phones with Tegra 2 SoC:

- Samsung Galaxy R
- Motorola Atrix
- Motorola Photon
- Droid X2

== General references ==
- Savov, Vlad (2010-12-11). "LG Star preview". engadget.com. AOL Inc. Archived from the original on 2011-02-12.
- Ziegler, Chris (2010-12-15). "LG Optimus 2X: FIRST dual-core smartphone launches with Android, 4-inch display, 1080p video recording". engadget.com. AOL Inc. Archived from the original on 2011-02-15. "...that LG Star we recently got our paws on is very real, though it won't go by that name at retail...this monster has picked up the Optimus 2X name as it morphs from a prototype into brutally fast, overpowered reality."
- "LG Launches World First and Fastest Dual-Core Smartphone". lg.com (Press release). LG Electronics, Inc. 2010-12-16. Archived from the original on 2010-12-19. "SEOUL, Dec. 16, 2010 -- LG Electronics (LG) today unveiled the LG Optimus 2X, the world's first smartphone with a dual-core processor."
- 박세림 기자 (2011-01-23). "첫 듀얼코어 스마트폰 '옵티머스2X' 출시" [The first dual-core smartphone Optimus 2X released]. ittoday.co.kr (in Korean). 아이티투데이. Archived from the original on 2011-01-27.
