= LG Optimus Chat =

Smartphone model

Optimus Chat
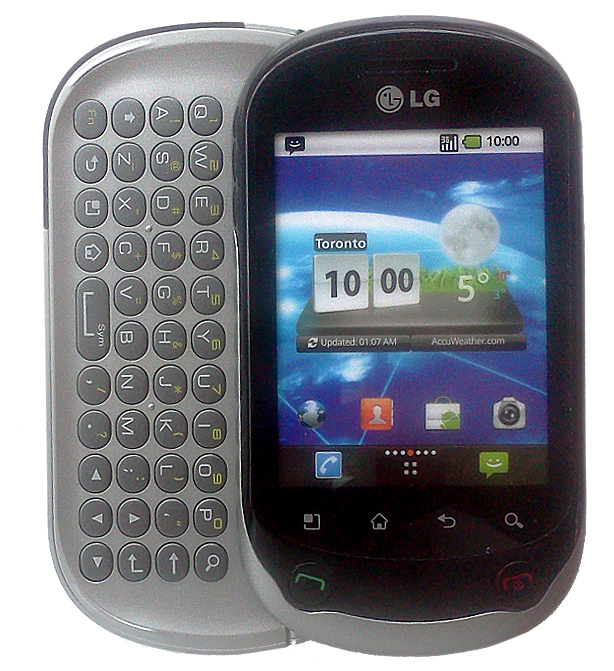
- LG Optimus Chat
- Brand: LG
- Manufacturer: LG Electronics, Inc.
- Series: Optimus
- Related: LG GT540 Optimus
- Compatible networks: GSM/GPRS/EDGE Quad-band (850/900/1800/1900); UMTS/HSPA tri-band (900/1700/2100); HSDPA 7.2 Mbit/s; GPRS Class 10 (4+1/3+2 slots), 32-48 kbit/s
- Form factor: Slide
- Operating system: Android 2.2 Froyo
- CPU: GSM 600 MHz Qualcomm MSM7227 ARM1136EJ-S; CDMA 600 MHz MSM7627 ARM1136EJ-S
- GPU: Qualcomm Adreno 200
- Memory: 512 MB Flash EEPROM SDRAM
- Storage: 512 MB ROM (140 or 170 MB user addressable)
- Removable storage: 2 GB microSD (supports up to 32 GB)
- Rear camera: VGA video recording (640×480 px, MPEG4 at 18 fps max.); Auto-focus; Europe and Asia 3-megapixels United States and Canada 3.15 megapixels (2048×1536 px max.)
- Display: TFT LCD, 2.8 in (71 mm) diagonal 240×320 pixels QVGA @ 206 ppi 3:4 aspect-ratio standard screen 256K colors
- Connectivity: 3.5 mm TRRS; Bluetooth 2.1 + EDR with A2DP; FM stereo receiver (87.5-108 MHz) with RDS (certain variants); Micro USB 2.0; Wi-Fi 802.11b/g
- Data inputs: Multi-touch capacitive touchscreen A-GPS; S-GPS; Accelerometer; Microphone; Proximity sensor Push buttons
- Other: Wi-Fi hotspot, USB tethering

The Optimus Chat is an entry-level, touch-screen smartphone with keyboard manufactured by LG Electronics, Inc. While it is very similar to the LG Optimus One, the main difference is that it includes a smaller touch screen (2.8-inch instead of 3.2-inch) but has a slide-out keyboard instead. It is currently running the Android 2.2 Froyo software stack but may run Android 2.3 Gingerbread.

== Carriers ==
This smartphone is now available on Koodo Mobile.

== See also ==
- Galaxy Nexus
