= LG Optimus Slider =

Android smartphone developed by LG Electronics

LG Optimus Slider LG Gelato Q/LS700/VM710
- Manufacturer: LG Electronics, Inc.
- Type: Smartphone
- Series: Optimus
- First released: United States: October 17, 2011 (Virgin Mobile)
- Compatible networks: CDMA/EVDO Rev. A Dual-band (800/1,900 MHz)
- Form factor: Bar
- Dimensions: 115 mm (4.5 in) H 59 mm (2.3 in) W 15 mm (0.59 in) D
- Weight: 157 g (5.5 oz)
- Operating system: Android 2.3
- CPU: 800MHz Qualcomm MSM7627T
- GPU: Qualcomm Adreno 200
- Memory: 512 MB RAM
- Storage: 150 MB internal storage
- Removable storage: microSD (supports up to 32 GB)
- Battery: 1.5Ah; Internal Rechargeable Li-ion; User replaceable
- Rear camera: 3.0 MP; Autofocus; Video 640x480 at 24 fps
- Display: TFT LCD, 3.2 in (81 mm) diagonal 320x480 px HVGA
- Connectivity: 3.5 mm TRRS; Bluetooth 3.0 with A2DP micro USB 2.0; Wi-Fi 802.11b/g/n
- Data inputs: Multi-touch capacitive touchscreen A-GPS; Accelerometer; Gyroscope; Proximity sensor
- SAR: 0.72W/kg (head), 0.39W/kg (body)
- Hearing aid compatibility: M4/T4

The LG Optimus Slider (also known as "Gelato Q") is an Android-powered cellphone developed by LG Electronics, Inc. It was first released on October 17, 2011 on Virgin Mobile USA in the United States. It was later released by Virgin Mobile USA as the LG Optimus Slider VM701.

== See also ==
- Galaxy Nexus
- List of Android smartphones
