= LG Optimus Black =

Android smartphone designed and manufactured by LG Electronics

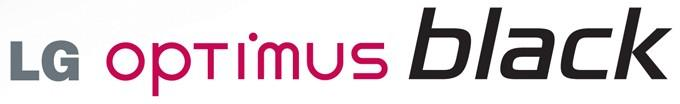

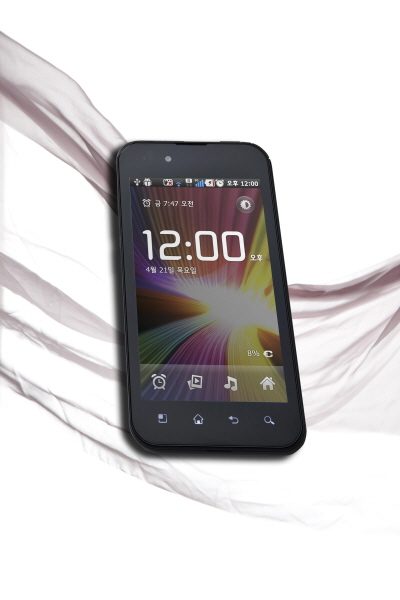
- Brand: LG Electronics, Inc.
- Manufacturer: LG Electronics, Inc.
- Type: Smartphone
- Series: Optimus
- Related: LG Optimus 3D; LG Optimus 2X
- Compatible networks: GSM/GPRS/EDGE Quad-band (850, 900, 1,800, and 1,900 MHz); HSPA Tri-band (900, 1,700, and 2,100 MHz); HSDPA 10.2 Mbit/s; HSUPA 5.76 Mbit/s, CDMA/EVDO (800, 1900 MHz)
- Form factor: Bar
- Dimensions: 121 mm (4.8 in) H 63.5 mm (2.50 in) W 9.2 mm (0.36 in) D
- Weight: 109 g (3.8 oz)
- Operating system: Android 2.2 Froyo (formerly); 4.0.4 Ice Cream Sandwich (current)
- CPU: 800 MHz ARM Cortex-A8 (Texas Instruments OMAP3630)
- GPU: PowerVR SGX530
- Memory: 512 MB RAM
- Storage: 2 GB (1 GB user-available)
- Removable storage: microSD (supports up to 32 GB)
- Battery: 1.500 mAh, Internal Rechargeable Li-ion; User replaceable
- Rear camera: 5.0 Mpx 2,592 x 1,944 px max. Autofocus; LED flash HD Video 720p at 30 fps
- Front camera: 2.0 Mpx
- Display: Nova IPS LCD, 4.0 in (100 mm) diagonal 480×800 px WVGA (~233 ppi), 16M COLORS
- Connectivity: 3.5 mm TRRS; Bluetooth 2.1 + EDR with A2DP; DLNA; FM stereo receiver micro USB 2.0; Wi-Fi 802.11b/g/n Wi-Fi DIRECT; Wi-Fi hotspot
- Data inputs: Multi-touch capacitive touchscreen A-GPS; Accelerometer; Ambient light sensor Gyroscope; Magnetometer; Proximity sensor

The LG P970 Optimus Black is a smartphone designed and manufactured by LG Electronics and was released in 2011. At 9.2 mm in thickness, it was LG's thinnest smartphone at the time of its release, and is slightly thinner than the iPhone 4. The LG Optimus Black features a WVGA NOVA display which has a brightness measured at 749 nits, which surpasses the 700 nits promised by LG. LG Optimus Black is claimed to be the first smartphone with a 2MP front camera.

== Availability ==
=== North America ===
In the United States, the LG Optimus Black is offered by various wireless carriers using their individual brandings.

- Sprint and Boost Mobile released it as the LG LS855 Marquee.
- NET10/Straight Talk offer it as the LG L85C though it retains the "Optimus Black" name.
- US Cellular offers it as the LG US855 Majestic.
- Other regional carriers offer it as the LG 855 Ignite.

In Canada, the LG Optimus Black Skype Edition variant is offered by Telus Mobility as a special edition in collaboration with Skype. It was later discontinued by that carrier, and all remaining stock was repackaged for Telus' Koodo Mobile brand instead.

== Software updates ==
The LG P970 Optimus Black and CDMA variants received an upgrade to Android 2.3.4, resulting in improved battery life, enhanced autofocus, and new apps. As of 4 January 2013, an upgrade to Android 4.0.4 was made available for the P970 through the official LGMobile Support Tool; however, no such upgrade was made available for the CDMA variants of the phone, and attempting to upgrade it using the P970's firmware would render the device inoperable.

== See also ==
- List of Android smartphones
- Smartphone
- Optimus
