= LG Optimus L7 =

Android smartphone designed and manufactured by LG Electronics

LG Optimus L7 P700

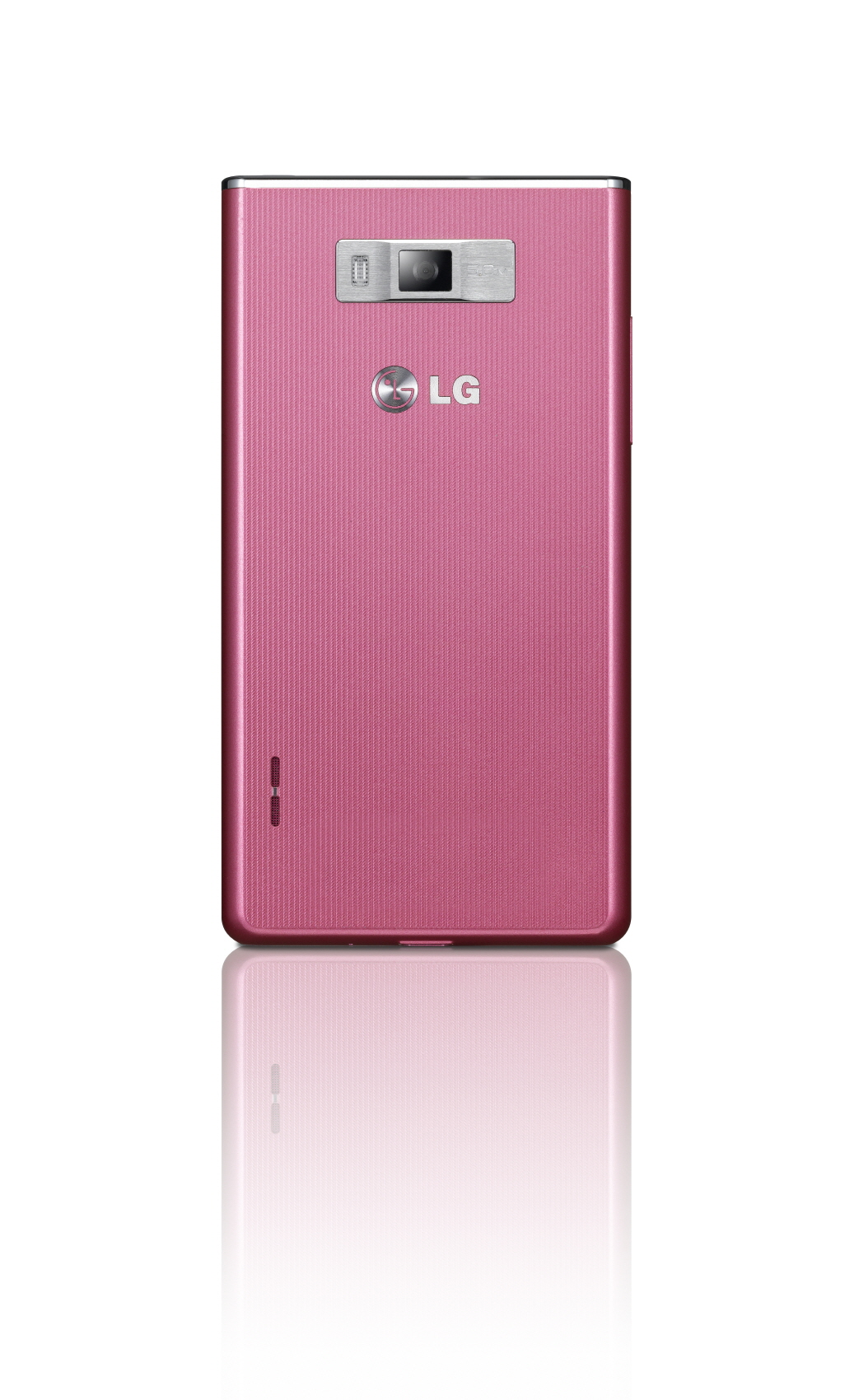
- LG Optimus L7 in pink
- Brand: LG
- Manufacturer: LG Electronics, Inc.
- Type: Smartphone
- Series: Optimus
- First released: July 2012
- Availability by region: July 2012
- Predecessor: LG Optimus L5
- Successor: LG Optimus L9, LG Optimus L7 II
- Related: LG Optimus 4X HD; LG Optimus L3; LG Optimus L5; LG Optimus L9
- Compatible networks: 2G GSM/GPRS/EDGE; 850, 900, 1800, 1900 MHz; 3G UMTS/HSPA+ (21 Mbps down, 5.76 Mbps up) 850, 900, 1900, 2100 MHz
- Form factor: Bar
- Dimensions: H 125.5mm W 67.1mm D 8.7mm
- Weight: 122 g (4 oz)
- Operating system: Android 4.0.3 Ice Cream Sandwich
- CPU: 1GHz Qualcomm Snapdragon MSM7227A
- GPU: Adreno 200
- Memory: 512 MB LP DDR2 RAM
- Storage: 4GB eMMC (2.4 GB user available)
- Removable storage: microSD (supports up to 32GB)
- Battery: 1,700 mAh
- Rear camera: 5.0 MP LED flash
- Front camera: VGA (640x480)
- Display: 4.3-inch (480x800) IPS LCD (~217 ppi)
- Connectivity: Wi-Fi 802.11 a/b/g/n, Wi-Fi Direct, DLNA, Bluetooth v3.0 + A2DP
- Data inputs: Touchscreen
- Other: Quick memo

LG Optimus L7 is a touchscreen Android smartphone designed and manufactured by LG Electronics. First announced at the Mobile World Congress in March 2012, it is available since July. The Optimus L7 runs Android 4.1.2 Jelly bean.

== Specifications ==
It was powered by a Qualcomm MSM7227A Snapdragon S1 with a Cortex-A5 clocking at 1.0 GHz and an Adreno 200 GPU. The LG Optimus L7 has a 4.3-inch IPS LCD with 480×800 pixel resolution with the “Floating Mass” display architecture. It has a Corning Gorilla Glass protection and has capability of multitouch.

The camera features a 5-megapixel rear-facing camera.

== See also ==
- LG Optimus
- List of LG mobile phones
