= LG Optimus L5 =

Android smartphone designed and manufactured by LG Electronics

LG Optimus L5 E610
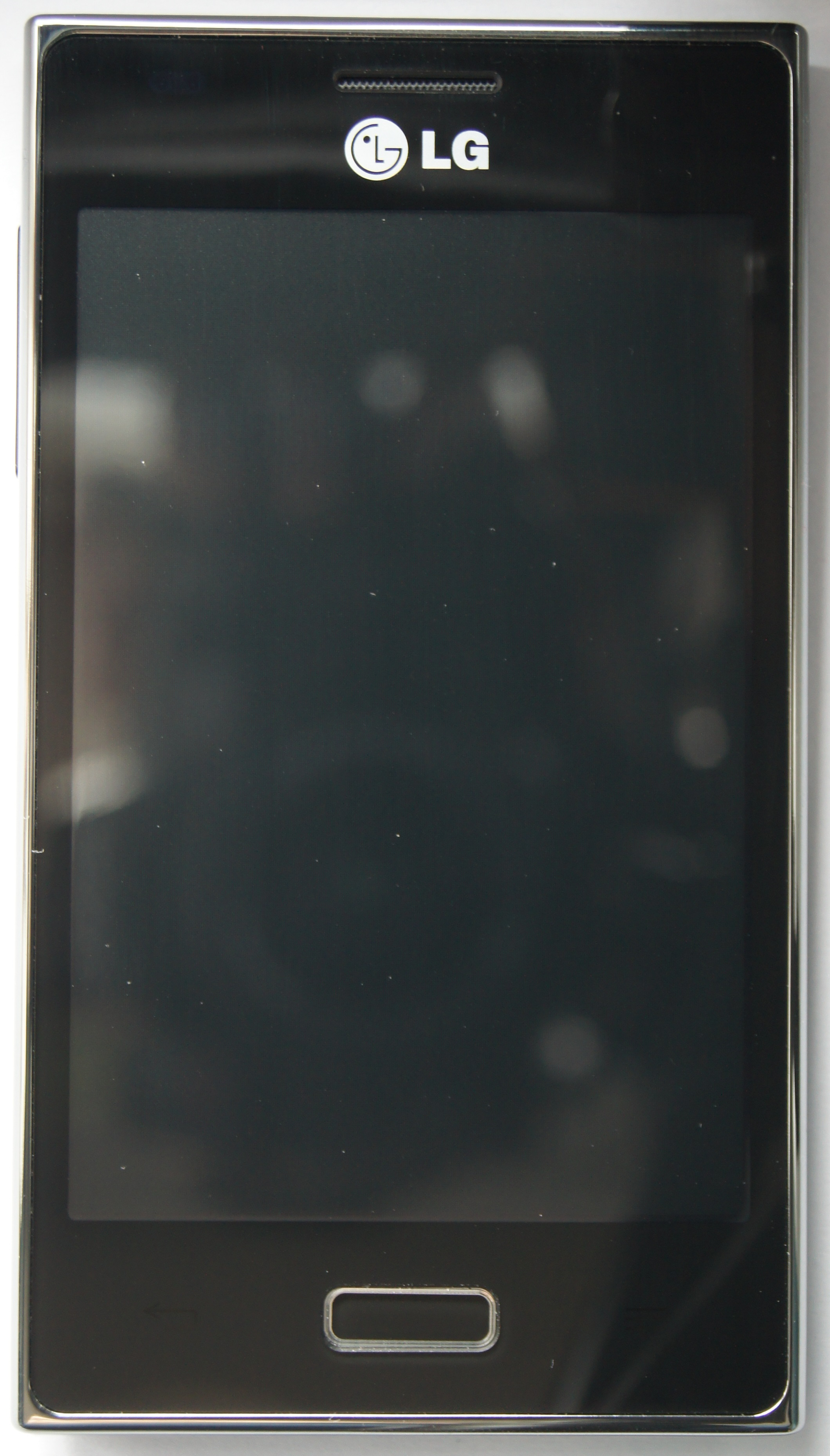
- Brand: LG
- Manufacturer: LG Electronics, Inc.
- Type: Smartphone
- Series: Optimus
- First released: June 2012
- Discontinued: Yes
- Successor: LG Optimus L5 II
- Related: LG Optimus 4X HD; LG Optimus L3; LG Optimus L7; LG Optimus L9
- Compatible networks: GSM/GPRS/EDGE; 850, 900, 1800, 1900 MHz; 3G UMTS/HSPA+ (7.2 Mbit/s) 900, 2100 MHz
- Form factor: Bar
- Dimensions: H: 118.3 mm W: 66.5 mm D: 9.9 mm
- Weight: 125 g (4 oz)
- Operating system: Android 4.0.3 Ice Cream Sandwich (upgradable to Android 4.1.2 Jelly Bean)
- CPU: 800 MHz
- GPU: Adreno 200
- Memory: 512 MB LP-DDR2 SDRAM
- Storage: 4 GB eMMC
- Removable storage: microSDHC (supports up to 32GB)
- Battery: 1,540 mAh
- Rear camera: 5.0 MP AF, flash
- Display: 4-inch TFT, 320x480 px
- Connectivity: Wi-Fi 802.11 a/b/g/n, Wi-Fi Direct, DLNA, Bluetooth 3.1 + HS, NFC
- Other: FM radio with RDS support
- References: LG E610 UK homepage

LG Optimus L5 (also marketed as LG Swift L5 in Poland) is a slate smartphone designed and manufactured by LG Electronics. Optimus L5 is the mid-range handset in the L series, and it makes the transition to Android 4.0.

== Hardware ==
LG Optimus L5 comes with an 800 MHz single-core Qualcomm MSM7225A CPU and an Adreno 200 GPU. The phone has a 4"-diagonal TFT capacitive touchscreen, displaying 16.7 million colours at 320×480 pixels.

The L5 has four physical keys: a power button at the top, volume up/down buttons on the left side, and the Home button at the front; as well as capacitive Back and Menu keys at either side of the Home button.

The device has a 5-megapixel camera with auto-focus and flash. The camera cover glass, though, is not scratch-resistant. Other standout features include NFC, Wi-Fi hotspot functionality, and an FM radio with RDS support.

The FM radio app has functionality to scan for radio stations that are put into an auto-generated stations list, out of which the user can select six favorites as channel presets. Each new scan wipes the list and the presets clean.

== Software ==
The phone comes with the LG-bundled QuickMemo app, with a button in quick settings. On tapping the QuickMemo button, the app captures a screenshot, and then offers a user interface to add and save the screenshot with or without annotations to the phone's gallery.

The device was released with Android 4.0.3 Ice Cream Sandwich (ICS), and depending on the operating system build level, can receive at least two OTA updates. The upgrade to Android 4.1.2 Jelly Bean must be performed through LG connectivity software on a Windows-enabled computer.

As of late 2018, the built-in weather app and widgets provided by Yahoo in Android 4.0.3 have stopped updating weather data. The Yahoo Weather app can be disabled in system settings, and a user can install a different weather app and widget of their choice. The upgrade to Android 4.1.2 introduces a new default weather app and widget provided by AccuWeather.

Since December 7, 2018, Android 4.0.x is no longer supported by Google Play Services with updates. This means, that phones continue to function and connect to a Google account, and while they may receive the latest available version to this component, then no further updates to Play Services will be installed, unless the operating system is updated or upgraded. Google's major communications apps, such as GMail and Hangouts, continue to work on ICS.

The Google Play Services component automatically updates in the background when connected to the Internet through a mobile or Wi-Fi network. Occasionally, the phone slows down during this update process, as and when a new version of Play Services is released.

In late May 2020, the YouTube app ceased support for Android 4.1. The YouTube mobile site continues to be accessible from the default browser.

== See also ==
- LG Optimus
- List of LG mobile phones
