= LG Optimus L9 =

Android smartphone designed and manufactured by LG Electronics

LG Optimus L9 P760
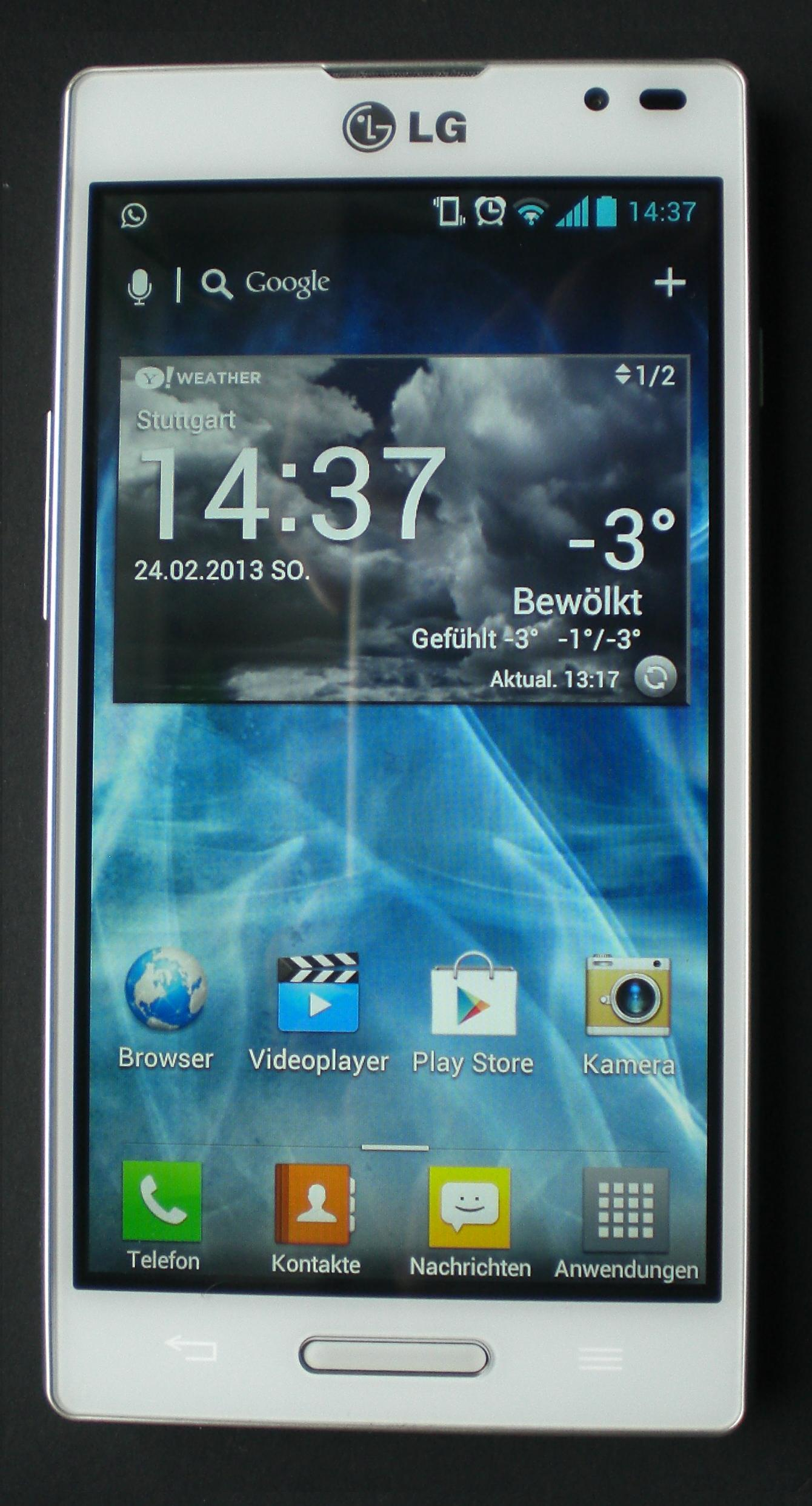
- Brand: LG
- Manufacturer: LG Electronics, Inc.
- Type: Smartphone
- Series: Optimus
- First released: December 19, 2012
- Availability by region: N/A
- Predecessor: LG Optimus L7
- Successor: LG Optimus L9 II
- Related: LG Optimus 4X HD; LG Optimus L3; LG Optimus L5; LG Optimus L7
- Compatible networks: 2G GSM/GPRS/EDGE; 850, 900, 1800, 1900 MHz; 4G UMTS/HSPA+ (21 Mb/s down, 5.76 Mb/s up) 900, 2100 MHz
- Form factor: Bar
- Dimensions: H 131.9 mm W 68.2 mm D 9.1 mm
- Weight: 125 g (4 oz)
- Operating system: Android 4.0.4 Ice Cream Sandwich (Upgradable to 4.1.2 Jelly Bean)
- System-on-chip: TI OMAP 4430
- CPU: Dual-core 1 GHz Cortex-A9 TI OMAP 4430
- GPU: PowerVR SGX540
- Memory: 1 GB RAM (Usable: 786 MB)
- Storage: 4 GB eMMC
- Removable storage: microSD (supports up to 32GB)
- Battery: 2,150 mAh Li-Ion
- Rear camera: 5.0 MP (8.0 MP in P768) LED flash
- Front camera: VGA (640x480)
- Display: 4.7-inch (540x960) IPS LCD (234 PPI) (4.5-inch in P769)
- Connectivity: Wi-Fi 802.11 b/g/n, Wi-Fi Direct, DLNA, Bluetooth 3.0 + A2DP, EDR, NFC (only in some markets)
- Data inputs: Touchscreen
- SAR: Head: 0.4 W/kg 1 g Body: 0.853 W/kg 1 g Hotspot: 0.853 W/kg 1 g

LG Optimus L9 is a touchscreen Android 4G smartphone designed and manufactured by LG Electronics. The phone was released on October 31, 2012. The phone is designed to be the successor of LG Optimus L7. The LG Optimus L9 brings many improvements upon its predecessor, including FullHD 1080p video recording, increased screen resolution, increased RAM size and a dual-core processor.

The Optimus L9 runs on Android 4.0 Ice Cream Sandwich with Optimus UI 3.0 user interface and features a 4.7-inch display and an OCR translator. It is upgradable to Android 4.1 Jelly Bean according to LG Electronics Hong Kong on their Facebook Fans Page.

In the United States, the Optimus L9 is carried by T-Mobile and MetroPCS in black.

== Variants ==
In different markets, LG offers four different variants of this phone, with model number P760, P765, P768, and P769. The differences are: P760 and P765 are identical except one has NFC while the other does not; P768 has 8 MP camera (others have 5 MP); P769 has 4.5-inch screen and a different processor (others have 4.7 in).

== See also ==
- LG Optimus
- List of LG mobile phones
