= LG F60 =

Mid-range smartphone

- Brand: LG
- Manufacturer: LG Electronics
- Type: Smartphone
- Series: LG F series
- First released: October 2014
- Discontinued: Yes
- Compatible networks: GSM, HSPA, LTE
- Form factor: Slate
- Colors: White; Black
- Dimensions: 127.5×67.9×10.6 mm (5.02×2.67×0.42 in)
- Weight: 129.6 g (4.57 oz)
- Operating system: Android 4.4.2 (KitKat)
- System-on-chip: Qualcomm MSM8916 Snapdragon 410 (28 nm)
- CPU: Quad-core 1.2 GHz Cortex-A53
- GPU: Adreno 306
- Memory: 1 GB RAM
- Storage: 4 GB, 8 GB
- Removable storage: microSDHC (dedicated slot)
- SIM: Micro-SIM (Single or Dual SIM)
- Battery: Removable Li-Ion 2100 mAh
- Rear camera: 5 MP, AF; LED flash, panorama Video: 720p@30fps
- Front camera: VGA
- Display: 4.5 in (114 mm) IPS LCD; 480 x 800 pixels, 5:3 ratio (~207 ppi density)
- Model: D390n, D392

The LG F60 is an Android-based mid-range smartphone designed and manufactured by LG Electronics. It was announced in September 2014 and officially released on October 1, 2014, as an affordable, LTE-enabled handset.

The dual-SIM version was released in India in February 2015.

== Specifications ==
=== Design ===
The LG F60 features a form factor with a plastic chassis and rounded corners, available in both black and white color options. It measures 127.5 mm in height, 67.9 mm in width, and has a thickness of 10.6 mm. Weighing approximately 129.6 grams, the device was sold in both single-SIM (Micro-SIM) and dual-SIM variations depending on the regional market.

=== Hardware ===
Under the hood, the device is powered by a 28-nanometer Qualcomm MSM8916 Snapdragon 410 chipset, configuration which features a quad-core 1.2 GHz Cortex-A53 central processing unit and an Adreno 306 graphics processing unit.

It comes equipped with 1 GB of RAM and was configured with either 4 GB or 8 GB of internal eMMC 4.5 storage. Users can expand the internal space via a dedicated microSDHC expansion slot.

The phone relies on a user-replaceable, removable Lithium-Ion 2100 mAh battery.

=== Display ===
The smartphone is equipped with a 4.5-inch IPS LCD capacitive touchscreen display. The panel supports a resolution of 480 × 800 pixels arranged in a 5:3 aspect ratio, translating to a pixel density of roughly 207 pixels per inch. The display occupies approximately 66.6% of the device's front face, leaving substantial bezels at the top and bottom.

=== Cameras ===
The LG F60 features a single 5-megapixel main camera on the rear panel that includes autofocus capabilities and an LED flash. The rear array supports panorama mode and is capable of shooting standard-definition video at 720p resolution at 30 frames per second.

On the front of the device, a basic 1.3-megpixel VGA selfie camera is displayed.

=== Software ===
The LG F60 shipped out of the box running Android 4.4.2 (KitKat), integrated with LG's custom proprietary user interface skin overlay with Cat4 LTE cellular data connectivity.
