= LG Optimus L3 =

Android smartphone designed and manufactured by LG Electronics

LG Optimus L3 E400
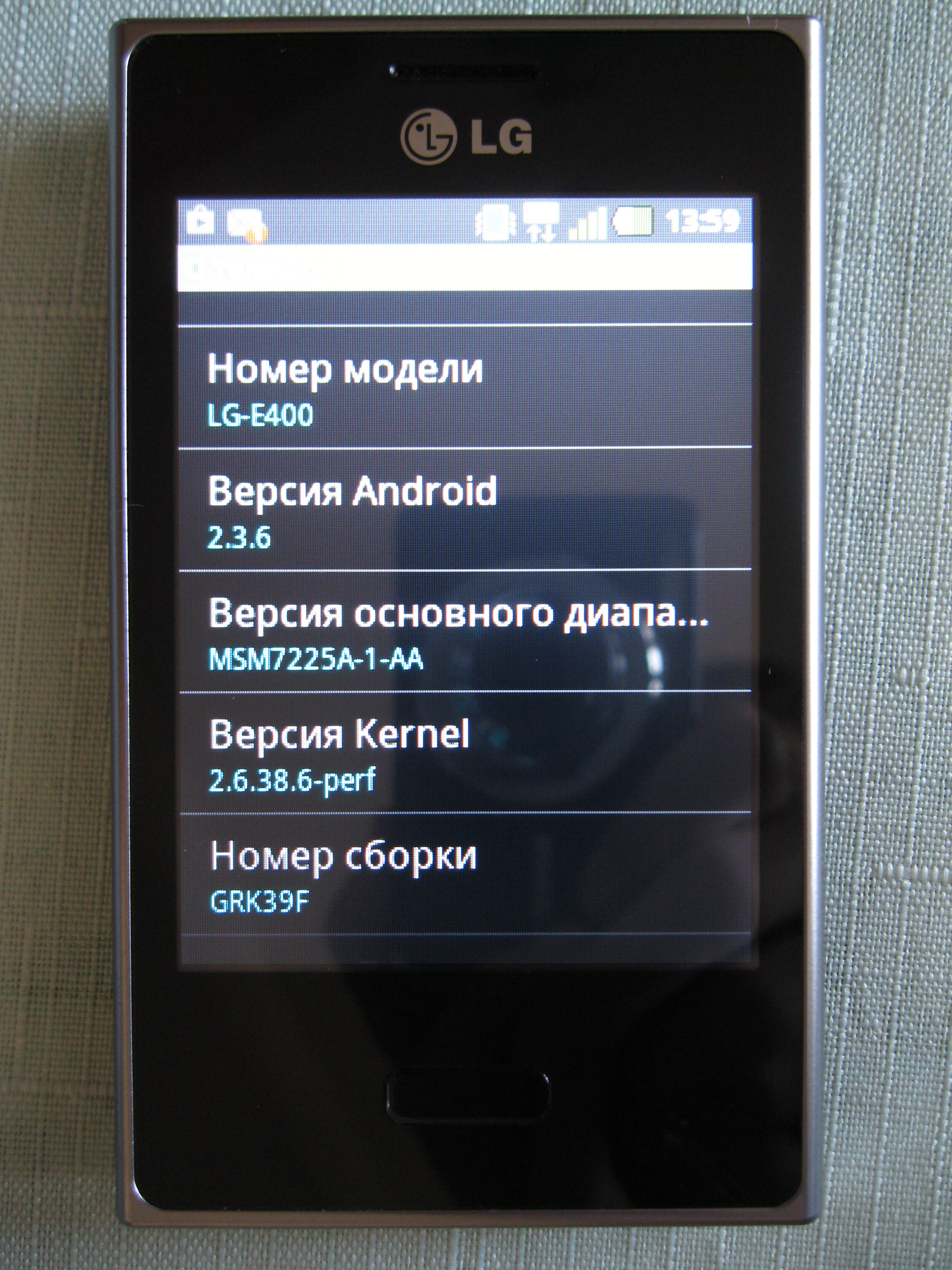
- LG L3 with Russian interface
- Brand: LG
- Manufacturer: LG Electronics, Inc.
- Type: Smartphone
- Series: Optimus
- First released: February 2012
- Successor: LG Optimus L3 II
- Related: LG Optimus 4X HD; LG Optimus L5; LG Optimus L7; LG Optimus L9
- Compatible networks: GSM/GPRS/EDGE; 850, 900, 1800, 1900 MHz; 3G UMTS/HSPA+ (3,6 Mbit) 900, 2100 MHz
- Form factor: Bar
- Dimensions: H 102.6mm W 61.6mm D 11.9mm
- Weight: 110 g (4 oz)
- Operating system: Android v2.3 Gingerbread
- CPU: Qualcomm Snapdragon MSM7225A, 800MHz
- GPU: Adreno 200
- Memory: 384 MB RAM
- Storage: 1GB eMMC
- Removable storage: microSD (supports up to 32GB)
- Battery: 1,500mAh
- Rear camera: still: 3.15 MP (2048×1536) video: 640×480
- Front camera: No
- Display: 3.2-inch (240x320) TFT (125 ppi)
- Connectivity: Wi-Fi 802.11 b/g/n, Wi-Fi Hotspot, DLNA, Bluetooth 3.0 + A2DP
- Data inputs: Touch

LG Optimus L3 is a smartphone designed and manufactured by LG Electronics. The Optimus L3 runs on Android 2.3 Gingerbread. The LG Optimus L3 is the budget-range handset in the L series.

== Hardware ==
LG Optimus L3 comes with an 800 MHz single-core Qualcomm MSM7225A CPU and an Adreno 200 GPU. It has a 3.2-inch TFT capacitive touch-screen, displaying 262,144 colours at QVGA resolution. Below the screen are two touch-sensitive capacitive buttons for navigating around Android (menu and back) which will light up when the user presses them. There is also a small, sharp-edged physical button to bring the user back to the home screen. The phone's single speaker is mounted on the front.

== Variants ==
In different markets, LG offers four different variants of this phone, with model numbers E400, E400F, E400R, and E405. The differences are: E400, E400F and E400R are identical except E400F has front-facing camera while the other does not; E400R is produced for Rogers and E405 is a dual-SIM version. (others have standard single-SIM version). The resolution of the LG Optimus L3 is 240x320.

== See also ==
- LG Optimus
- List of LG mobile phones
