= LG Optimus L5 II =

Android smartphone model

LG Optimus L5 II E460
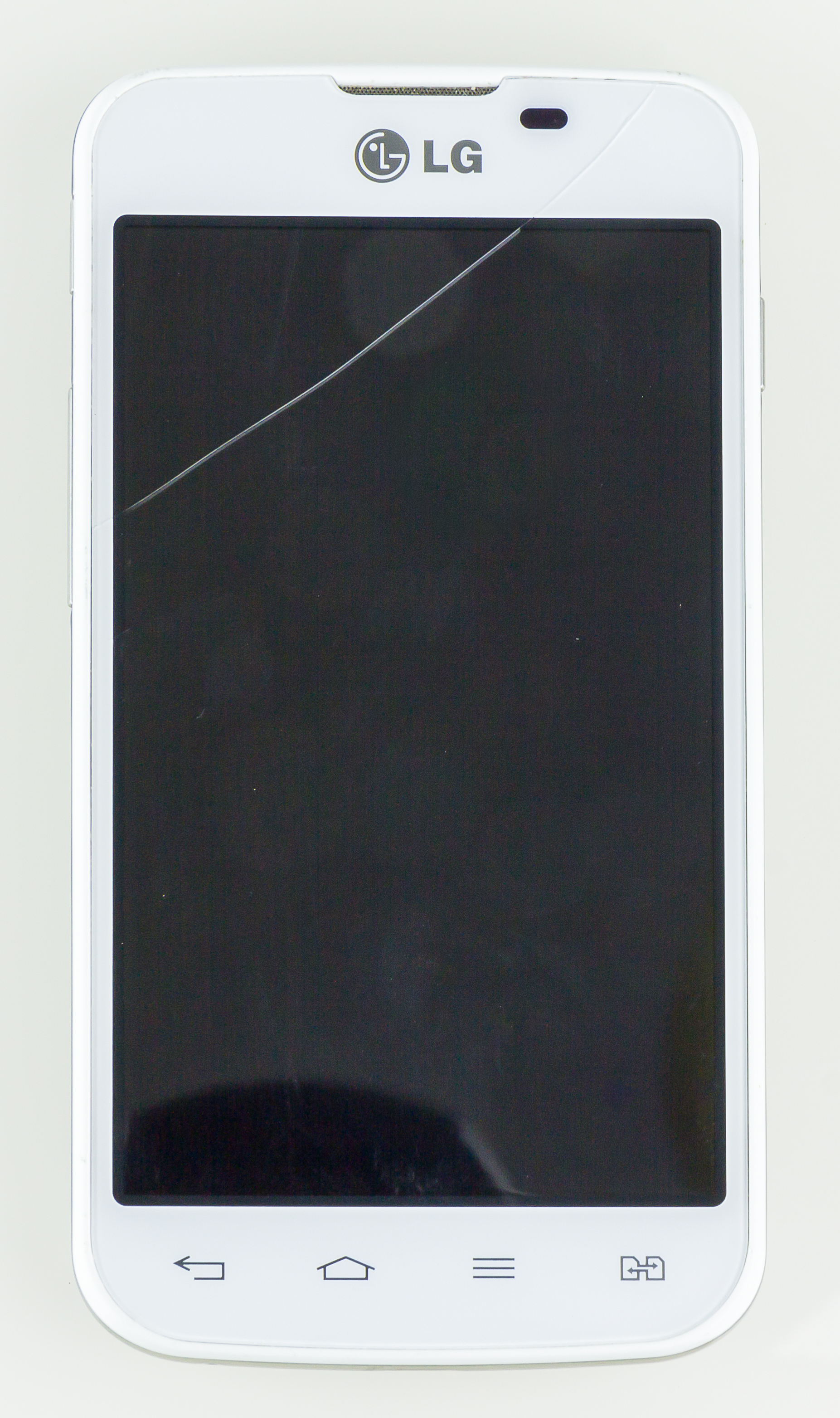
- Brand: LG
- Manufacturer: LG Electronics, Inc.
- Type: Smartphone
- Series: Optimus
- First released: April 2013
- Predecessor: LG Optimus L5
- Compatible networks: GSM/GPRS/EDGE; 850, 900, 1800, 1900 MHz; 3G UMTS/HSPA+ (7,2 Mbit) 900, 2100 MHz
- Form factor: Bar
- Dimensions: H 117.5mm W 62.2mm D 9.2mm
- Weight: 103.3 g (4 oz)
- Operating system: Android 4.1.2 Jelly Bean
- CPU: 1 GHz MediaTek MT6575 (40 nm)
- GPU: PowerVR SGX531
- Memory: 512 MB LP DDR2 RAM
- Storage: 4GB eMMC
- Removable storage: microSD (supports up to 32GB)
- Battery: Li-Ion, model BL-44JH; 1,700 mAh / 6.5 Wh / 3.8 V
- Rear camera: 5.0 MP
- Display: 4-inch (480×800) IPS
- Connectivity: Wi-Fi 802.11 a/b/g/n, Wi-Fi Direct, DLNA, Bluetooth 3.1 + HS

LG Optimus L5 II is a middle range slate-format Android smartphone designed and manufactured by LG Electronics. The Optimus L5 II phone runs Android 4.1 Jelly Bean.

== Hardware ==
The Optimus L5 runs on a 1 GHz MediaTek MT6575 CPU, and has 512 MB of RAM. There also exists a dual-SIM variant called LG Optimus L5 II Dual (E455).

== See also ==
- LG Optimus
- List of LG mobile phones
