= LG Optimus Q =

Smartphone model

LG Optimus Q LU2300

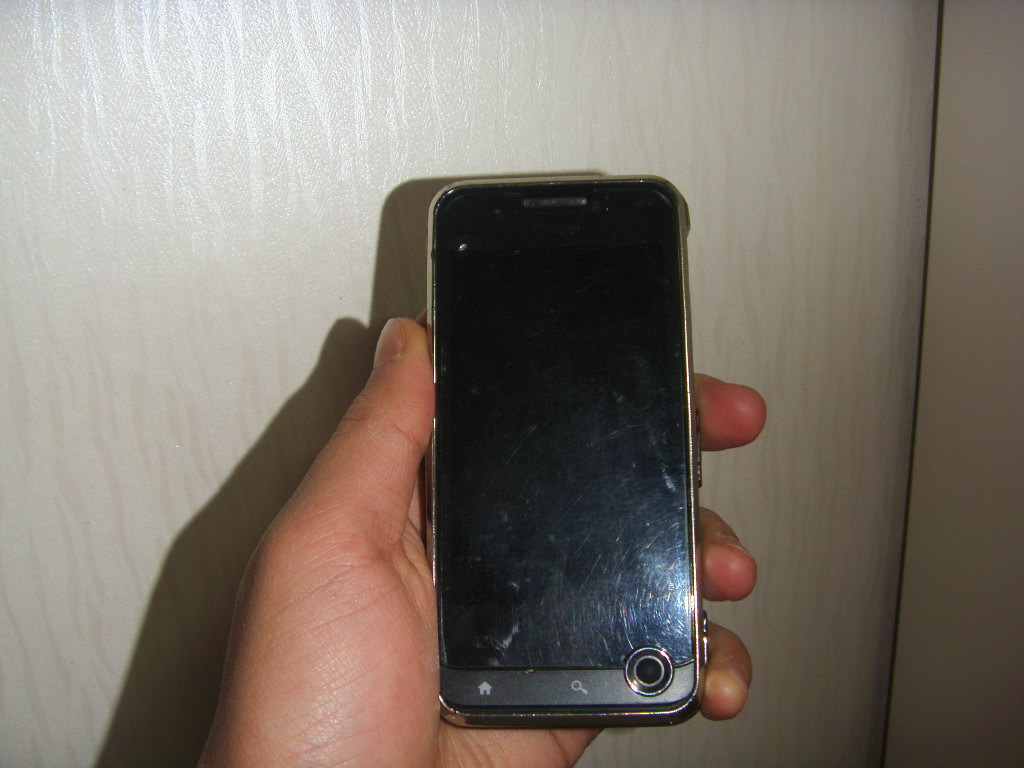
- Manufacturer: LG Electronics
- Type: Smartphone
- First released: May 2010
- Related: LG Optimus
- Operating system: Android 2.1 (upgradable to 2.2)
- CPU: Qualcomm Snapdragon QSD8250, 1 GHz
- Memory: 512 MiB RAM, 512 MiB ROM
- Rear camera: 5-megapixel autofocus with LED flash
- Display: 800 x 480 px
- Connectivity: GSM850/900/1800/1900, HSDPA, 802.11b/g/n
- Data inputs: Multi-touch capacitive touchscreen display, QWERTY keyboard, touch-sensitive optical trackpad

The LG Optimus Q, also known as the LG LU2300, is a high-end smartphone manufactured by LG Electronics for the South Korean market. It is LG's first high-end handset to run Google's Android operating system.

The handset features a slide-out QWERTY keyboard, and a capacitive touchscreen display.

== See also ==
- Galaxy Nexus
- List of Android smartphones
