= LG Optimus Zip =

Android smartphone developed by LG Electronics

LG Optimus Zip LG Enlighten (VS700)/ LG Eclypse
- Manufacturer: LG Electronics, Inc.
- Type: Smartphone
- First released: United States: September 22, 2011 (Verizon Wireless)
- Compatible networks: CDMA/EVDO Rev. A Dual-band (800/1,900 MHz)
- Form factor: Bar
- Dimensions: 115 mm (4.5 in) H 59 mm (2.3 in) W 15 mm (0.59 in) D
- Weight: 157 g (5.5 oz)
- Operating system: Android 2.3.5
- CPU: 800 MHz Qualcomm MSM7627T
- GPU: Qualcomm Adreno 200
- Memory: 512 MB RAM
- Storage: 150 MB internal storage
- Removable storage: microSD (supports up to 32 GB)
- Battery: 1.5Ah; Internal Rechargeable Li-ion; User replaceable
- Rear camera: 3.0 MP; Autofocus; Video 640x480 at 24 fps
- Display: TFT LCD, 3.2 in (81 mm) diagonal 320x480 px HVGA
- Connectivity: 3.5 mm TRRS; Bluetooth 3.0 with A2DP micro USB 2.0; Wi-Fi 802.11b/g/n
- Data inputs: Multi-touch capacitive touchscreen A-GPS; Accelerometer; Gyroscope; Proximity sensor
- SAR: 0.72W/kg (head), 0.39W/kg (body)
- Hearing aid compatibility: M4/T4
- Website: Optimus Zip website

The LG Optimus Zip (also known as the LG Enlighten for Verizon and the LG Eclypse in Canada) is an Android-powered cellphone developed by LG Electronics, Inc. It was first released on September 22, 2011 on Verizon Wireless in the United States.

== Variants ==
=== LG Enlighten ===
In the United States, Verizon Wireless was the first carrier to sell the phone.

=== LG Eclypse ===
In Canada, the LG Eclypse C800G was released on December 12, 2011 for Bell Mobility and Virgin Mobile Canada. The touchscreen is slightly bigger at 3.5 inches, and the digital camera has a higher resolution of 5 megapixels and HD 720p video recording. It is also an HSPA+ device, supporting download speeds of up to 14.4 Mbit/s.

== See also ==
- Galaxy Nexus
- List of Android devices
