= LG G Pad 8.3 =

2013 Android tablet computer

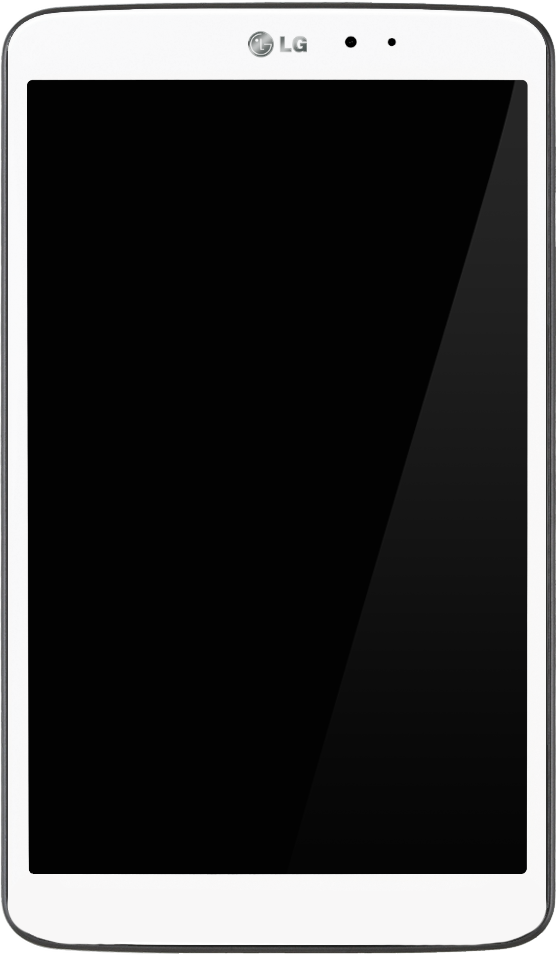
- LG G Pad 8.3 in White
- Also known as: V500 (WiFi); VK810 (LTE)
- Manufacturer: LG Electronics
- Product family: LG G series
- Type: Tablet, media player, PC
- Released: 14 October 2013; 12 years ago (WiFi only); 6 March 2014; 12 years ago (LTE)
- Operating system: Android 4.2.2 "Jelly Bean"; Upgradable to Android 5.0.2 "Lollipop" via OTA update
- CPU: WiFi version: 1.7 GHz quad-core Krait 300 SoC processor Snapdragon 600; Verizon LTE version: 1.5 Ghz quad-core
- Memory: 2 GB
- Storage: 16 GB flash memory, microSDXC slot
- Display: 1920×1200 px, 8.3 in (21 cm) diagonal, WUXGA IPS display (273 ppi; 107 ppcm)
- Graphics: Adreno 320
- Input: Multi-touch screen, digital compass, proximity and ambient light sensors, accelerometer
- Camera: 5.0 MP AF rear-facing, 1.3 MP front-facing
- Connectivity: Cat3 100:50 Mbit/s hexa-band 800, 850, 900, 1,800, 2,100, 2,600 MHz (4G, LTE model) Verizon LTE model: Band 4 (1700/1900 AWS), 13 (700 C); HSPA+ 42, 5.76 Mbit/s 850, 900, 1,900, 2,100 MHz (4G, LTE model); HSPA+ 21, 5.76 Mbit/s quad 850, 900, 1,900, 2,100 MHz (3G, WiFi model); EDGE/GPRS Quad 850, 900, 1,800, 1,900 MHz (3G, WiFi model) Wi-Fi 802.11a/b/g/n (2.4, 5 GHz), Bluetooth (3.0 with Android 4.2; 4.0 LE with Android 4.4), HDMI (external cable)
- Power: 4,600 mAh Li-ion battery
- Dimensions: 216.8 mm (8.54 in) H 126.5 mm (4.98 in) W 8.3 mm (0.33 in) D
- Weight: 338 g (0.745 lb)
- Predecessor: LG Optimus Pad
- Successor: LG G Pad 7.0; LG G Pad 8.0; LG G Pad 10.1

The LG G Pad 8.3 (also known as LG G Tab 8.3) is an 8.3-inch (21 cm) Android-based tablet computer produced and marketed by LG Electronics. It belongs to the LG G series, and was announced on 4 September 2013 and launched in November 2013. Unlike its predecessor which had an 8.9-inch (23 cm) screen, the G Pad 8.3 has a smaller 8.3-inch (21 cm) screen.

== History ==
The G Pad 8.3 was first announced on 31 August 2013. It was officially unveiled at the 2013 Mobile World Conference. At that time, LG confirmed that the G Pad 8.3 would be released worldwide in the fourth quarter (Q4) of 2013.

On 14 October 2013, the G Pad 8.3 was released in Korea for 550,000 won. It was later released to the US market on 15 November 2013 for US$349.99.

On 10 December 2013, a version of the G Pad 8.3 with stock Android 4.4 (similarly to one of its competitors, the Nexus 7) was released on Google Play Store.

Starting in March 2014, Verizon Wireless began offering a version of the G Pad 8.3 for Verizon's 4G/LTE network, known as the LG G Pad 8.3 LTE. It launched at $99.99 from March 6–10, and then was offered at $199.99—both with a two-year activation. It was also available without a contract at $299.99.

== Features ==
The G Pad 8.3 is released with Android 4.2.2 Jelly Bean. LG has customized the interface with its Optimus UI software. As well as apps from Google, including Google Play, Gmail and YouTube, it has access to LG apps such as QPair, QSlide, KnockOn, and Slide Aside.

The G Pad 8.3 has been available in four variants:

- LG G Pad 8.3 LTE (VK810) for the Verizon Wireless LTE network
- LG G Pad 8.3 Google Play Edition (V510) with Google apps and automatic updates
- LG G Pad 8.3 Black (V500 Black) for WiFi-only
- LG G Pad 8.3 White (V500 White) for WiFi-only

Internal storage is 16 GB, with a microSDXC card slot for expansion. It has an 8.3-inch (21 cm) WUXGA TFT screen with a resolution of 1920 by 1200 pixels. It has a 1.3 MP front camera without flash and 5.0 MP AF rear-facing camera, as well as the ability to record HD videos.

In April 2014, LG released Android 4.4.2 KitKat with some improvements to the UI and the browser, as well as some new graphical details such as the transparent status bar and the white indicators included with KitKat. In late June 2014, LG released the Android 4.4.4 KitKat update for the G Pad 8.3 Google Play Edition.

In April 2015 the GPE versions were updated to Android 5.0 Lollipop.
