= LG Optimus 3D Max =

Android smartphone model by LG

LG Optimus 3D MAX
- Manufacturer: LG Electronics
- Type: Smartphone
- Series: Optimus
- Predecessor: LG Optimus 3D
- Compatible networks: Quad-band GSM/GPRS/EDGE; 850/900/1800/1900 MHz; HSPA+ (21 Mbit/s); HSDPA; HSUPA
- Form factor: Slate
- Dimensions: 126.8 mm (4.99 in) H 67.4 mm (2.65 in) W 9.8 mm (0.39 in) D
- Weight: 148 g (5.2 oz)
- Operating system: Android 2.3 Gingerbread, upgradable to Android 4.0 Ice Cream Sandwich (for Korea)
- System-on-chip: TI OMAP 4430
- CPU: 1.2 GHz dual-core Cortex-A9
- GPU: PowerVR SGX540 (300 MHz)
- Memory: 1 GB RAM
- Storage: 8 GB internal flash memory
- Removable storage: microSD slot (up to 32 GB)
- Battery: Internal removable Li-ion BL-48LN, 1520 mAh, 3.7 V
- Rear camera: Dual 5 MP, f/2.8, autofocus, LED flash; Video recording: 1080p at 30 fps, stereo 720p at 30 fps
- Front camera: 0.3 MP VGA
- Display: 4.3 in (109 mm) autostereoscopic IPS LCD, 480×800 px WVGA, 16M colors

The LG Optimus 3D MAX is a dual-core Android smartphone developed by LG Electronics. It is the successor to the LG Optimus 3D and features a stereoscopic display based on a parallax barrier. LG Electronics officially introduced the Optimus 3D MAX on 27 February 2012 at the Mobile World Congress 2012.

It is the second smartphone from LG capable of recording 3D photos and videos and playing them back on its built-in 3D screen without requiring 3D glasses, or displaying them on an external 3D television.

== Design ==
The LG Optimus 3D MAX features a slate design with an all-glass front surface made of Gorilla Glass 2, a textured plastic rear panel, and a metal side frame with rounded corners.

The front panel has four standard capacitive touch buttons. The stereoscopic camera module protrudes slightly from the surface of the rear panel.

The LG Optimus 3D MAX has four physical keys: a power/lock button, dual volume controls, and a dedicated "3D" key to open the 3D menu. The camera does not feature a dedicated mechanical shutter button and is controlled via the touchscreen; however, third-party software allows the camera to be operated using the 3D button. Additionally, pressing the 3D button while using the camera app toggles between standard and stereoscopic capture modes.

The smartphone includes a 3.5 mm headphone/headset jack, microUSB, and MHL support. The front VGA camera is positioned above the display. On the back, two 3D camera lenses are spaced 24 mm apart with an LED flash situated between them. SIM and microSD card slots are located beneath the back cover.

== Specifications ==
The smartphone is equipped with 1 GB of RAM and 8 GB of internal flash storage. It also includes a microSD slot supporting card capacities up to 32 GB.

The LG Optimus 3D MAX features an in-house 4.3-inch IPS capacitive touchscreen display with a resolution of 480 × 800 pixels, capable of rendering 16 million colors. A distinguishing feature of LG's IPS panels is high brightness and wide viewing angles, which were also supplied to Apple for certain iPhone models.

The display uses a controllable matrix to create a parallax barrier, enabling users to view 3D images glasses-free. The optimal viewing distance for the 3D effect is 30–40 cm from the eyes to the screen.

The original LG Optimus 3D includes a micro-HDMI port, whereas the 3D MAX uses MHL via microUSB. Both devices feature a dual 5-megapixel camera system capable of recording and playing full HD (1080p) video as well as stereoscopic 720p video, which can be output to external 3D displays. The optimal range for capturing stereoscopic photos and videos is 0.5–4 meters from the camera.

The LG Optimus 3D MAX is built on the Texas Instruments TI OMAP4430 system-on-chip, featuring a 300 MHz PowerVR SGX540 GPU with support for OpenGL ES v2.0, OpenGL v1.1, OpenVG v1.1, and EGL v1.3.

The device utilizes a Tri-Dual architecture incorporating a dual-core Cortex-A9 processor clocked at 1.2 GHz, dual-channel data transfer, and dual-channel memory architecture.

Out of the box, the smartphone runs Android 2.3 Gingerbread, with an official upgrade to Android 4.0 Ice Cream Sandwich promised by the manufacturer. The device uses a removable 1520 mAh Li-ion battery.
