= LG Optimus LTE =

Android smartphone manufactured by LG Electronics

LG Optimus LTE (LG Nitro HD / LG Spectrum / LG Optimus True HD LTE)
- LG Optimus LTE
- Manufacturer: LG Electronics
- First released: (South Korea) October 10, 2011 (Canada) November 22, 2011 (United States) December 4, 2011 (Japan) December 15, 2011
- Availability by region: US: Q4-2011
- Predecessor: LG Optimus 3D; LG Revolution (Verizon Wireless)
- Successor: LG Optimus LTE 2
- Form factor: Touchscreen smartphone
- Dimensions: Different by country
- Weight: Different by country
- Operating system: Android 2.3.5 Gingerbread, upgrade to 4.0 ICS
- CPU: Qualcomm Snapdragon S3 (dual-core 1.5 GHz)
- Memory: 1 GB RAM
- Storage: 16 GB on board, supports up to 32 GB microSDHC
- Battery: 1830 mAh Talk time GSM = 7 hrs Standby time GSM = 259 hrs
- Rear camera: 8 MP AF, digital zoom with LED Flash
- Front camera: 1.3 MP imager for video chat, self image capture
- Display: 4.5-inch 1280×720 px IPS LCD at 329 ppi, 16 M colors,
- Connectivity: LTE 700 MHz, Class 17, GSM 850, 900, 1,900, and 1,800 MHz, audio jack 3.5 mm, Micro USB 2.0 HS, corporate sync, BOTA, Wi-Fi 2.4 GHz, 5 GHz 802.11 b/g/n, Bluetooth 3.0, HSPA at 14.4 Mbit/s
- Data inputs: Multi-touch capacitive touchscreen display, accelerometer, ambient light sensor, proximity sensor,
- Other: aGPS with Google Maps, Google Street View, Google Latitude, Android Market

The LG Optimus LTE is one of the first released 4G LTE smartphones running under the Android operating system that is manufactured by LG. It was first released on October 10, 2011 in South Korea.

== Variants ==
Model	Product name	Country	Carrier	Network	Release date	Size	weight
LG P936	LG Optimus True HD LTE	International		FDD-LTE + WCDMA+GSM		132.9 x 67.9 x 10.4 mm	135 g
SU640	LG Optimus LTE	South Korea	SK Telecom	FDD-LTE + WCDMA+GSM	October 10, 2011	69 x 133.9 x 10.5 mm	135.4 g
LU6200	LG Optimus LTE	South Korea	LG U+	FDD-LTE + WCDMA + GSM + CDMA2000 EV-DO Rev.A & B	October 10, 2011	67.9 x 132.9 x 10.4 mm	139.17 g
LG P930	LG Optimus LTE	Canada	Bell Canada	FDD-LTE + WCDMA+GSM	November 22, 2011	133.9 x 67.9 x 10.48 mm	135 g
LG P930	LG Nitro HD	United States	AT&T	FDD-LTE + WCDMA+GSM	December 4, 2011	134 x 68 x 10 mm	128 g
L-01D	Optimus LTE L-01D	Japan	NTT docomo	FDD-LTE + WCDMA+GSM	December 15, 2011	67.9 x 132.9 x 11.4 mm	140 g
LG VS920	LG Spectrum	United States	Verizon Wireless	FDD-LTE + CDMA2000 EV-DO Rev.A	January 19, 2012	135 x 69 x 11 mm	141 g
LG P935	LG Optimus LTE	Canada	Telus	FDD-LTE + WCDMA+GSM	February 2012	133.9 x 67.9 x 10.5 mm	135 g

=== LG Nitro HD ===
The LG Nitro HD (LG P930) is U.S. variant of the LG Optimus LTE for AT&T. It was released on December 4, 2011. At the time of release, it was the only 4G phone on AT&T to feature a true HD, 1280×720 AH-IPS display. An OS update to Android 4.0, Ice Cream Sandwich, was released on July 31, 2012.

=== LG Spectrum ===
The LG Spectrum (LG VS920) is U.S. variant of the LG Optimus LTE for Verizon Wireless. It was released on January 19, 2012. An OS update to Android 4.0, Ice Cream Sandwich, was released in November 2012.

=== Optimus LTE L-01D ===
The Optimus LTE L-01D is Japanese variant of the LG Optimus LTE for NTT docomo. It was released on December 15, 2011. This variant includes several additional features such as 1seg terrestrial television and FeliCa (Wallet Mobile).

=== LG Optimus True HD LTE ===
The LG Optimus True HD LTE(LG-P936) is among other countries in Europe and Asia the name of the German edition of the LG Optimus LTE for Vodafone. In Germany it was presented to the public for the first time at the end of April 2012 in Düsseldorf. In Sweden, Portugal, Singapore and Hong Kong the Optimus True HD LTE was also sold from the end of April.

== See also ==
- LG Optimus
