= LG Optimus 4X HD =

Android smartphone designed and manufactured by LG Electronics

LG Optimus 4X HD P880
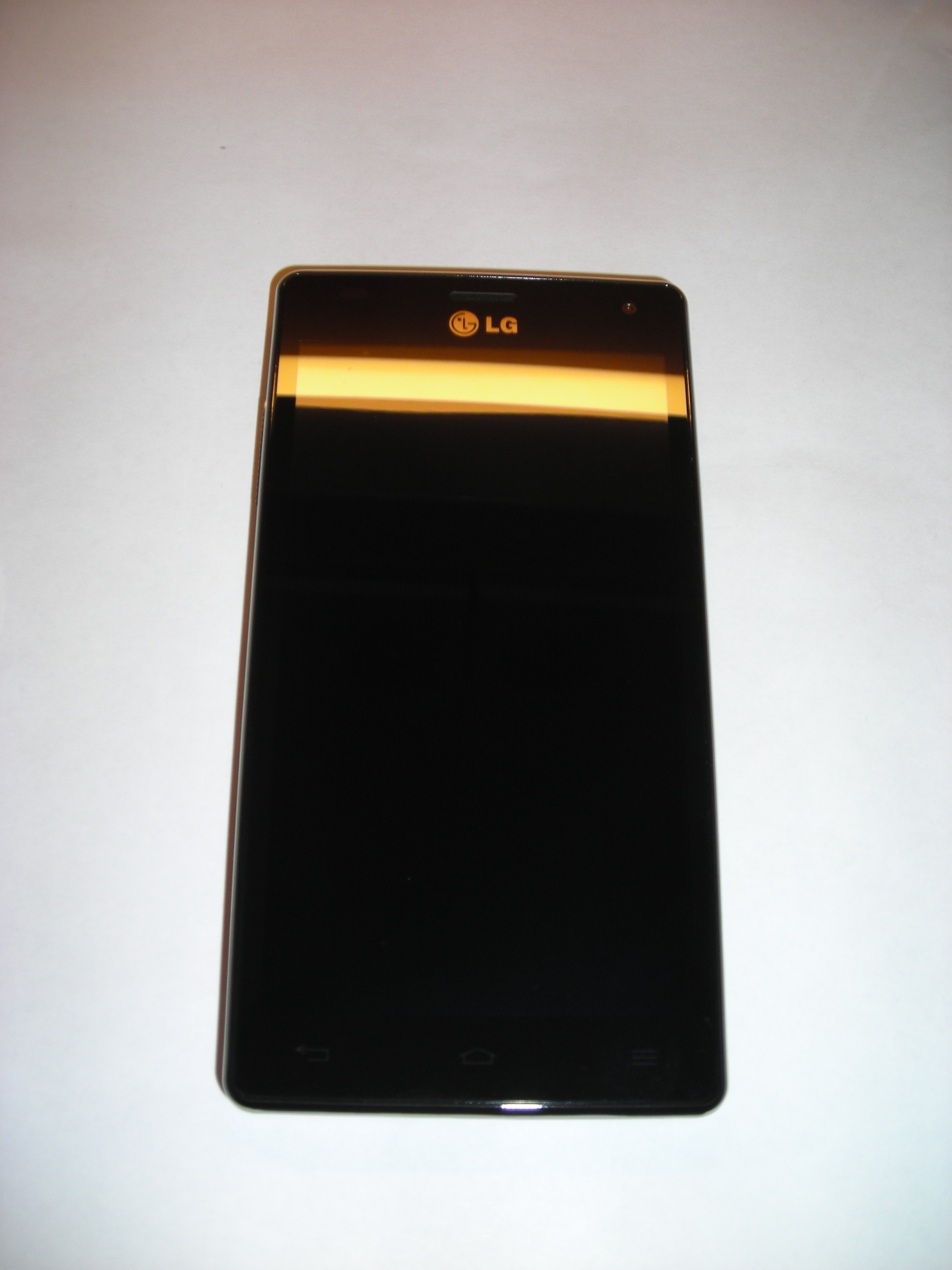
- LG Optimus 4X HD
- Brand: LG
- Manufacturer: LG Electronics, Inc.
- Type: Smartphone
- Series: Optimus
- First released: June 2012
- Predecessor: LG Optimus 2X
- Successor: LG Optimus G
- Related: LG Optimus 3D Max; LG Optimus G LG Optimus LTE
- Compatible networks: 2G GSM/GPRS/EDGE; 850, 900, 1800, 1900 MHz; 3G UMTS/HSPA+ (21 Mbps down, 5.76 Mbps up) 850, 900, 1900, 2100 MHz
- Form factor: Slate
- Dimensions: H 132.4 mm W 68.1 mm D 8.9 mm
- Weight: 141 g (5.0 oz)
- Operating system: Original: Android 4.0.3 "Ice Cream Sandwich"; Last: Android 4.1.2 "Jelly Bean"
- CPU: 1.5 GHz NVIDIA Tegra 3 T30 Quad-Core processor with additional 500 MHz processor, 40nm, NEON, 1 MB L2 Cache
- GPU: NVIDIA Tegra 3 ULP GeForce 2 (520MHz Speed, 12 Cores, Advanced Anisotropic Filtering, NVIDIA Real-time Dynamic Texture/Dynamic light/Physics Generator, 5x Anti-aliasing, Early-Z)
- Memory: 1 GB 32-Bit Single-Channel LP DDR2 RAM 1066MHz
- Storage: 16 GB eMMC
- Removable storage: microSD (supports up to 64GB)
- Battery: 2150 mAh SIO+
- Rear camera: 8.0 MP; Autofocus; LED flash Sony 1/4.0 IMX111PQ BSI sensor, F2.4 Aperture, Full HD 1080p 30Fps Video Rec., Image Stabilization, HDR, Panorama, ISO 400, Time Catch Shot, Voice Shutter
- Front camera: Sony Exmor RS IMX119 1.3MP, HD 720p
- Display: 4.7-inch (11.9 cm) True HD IPS LCD with 1280×720 pixels (313 ppi), 550nit brightness, 16777216 Colors, 24-bit,16:9 Aspect Ratio, Corning Gorilla Glass 1
- Connectivity: Wi-Fi 802.11a/b/g/n2.4GHz-5GHz, Wi-Fi Direct, DLNA, NFC; Bluetooth 4.0 HS BLE, MHL, MicroUSB

The LG Optimus 4X HD is a slate, multi-touch smartphone running the Android operating system. Designed and manufactured by LG Electronics. The Optimus 4X HD was the world's first smartphone announced with a quad-core processor along with the HTC One X and the Samsung Galaxy S3 and the fourth phone in the LG Optimus-Android series. LG first introduced the LG Optimus 4X HD at Mobile World Congress. The Optimus 4X HD was launched with Android 4.0 Ice Cream Sandwich. Since April 2013, some variants have had a Jellybean update available.

== Hardware ==
The LG Optimus 4X HD is the first phone to feature Nvidia's Tegra 3 chip offering significant mobile gaming performance at release. LG Optimus 4X HD was also the first phone announced with a quad core processor. The chip has four physical cores clocked at 1.5 GHz in addition to a lower-clocked fifth core. The fifth core is clocked up to 500 MHz and runs when the handset is idle or doing only simple tasks, less-demanding tasks such as active standby and music playback. LG Optimus 4X HD is equipped with a True HD IPS display with Ultra high resolution 313PPI, packaged in an 8.9 mm-thick, prism-edged design. The device comes in black and white The LG Optimus 4X HD also includes a 12-core graphics processing unit. There is an 8-megapixel backside-illuminated sensor camera on the rear with LED flash, HDR, continuous shot, support 1080p Full HD video recorder and 1.3MP camera on the front for video, conferencing or self-portrait. The phone also includes a Li-Ion 2150 mAh battery, stand-by up to 730 h (2G) / up to 686 h (3G), talk time up to 9 h 20 min (2G) / Up to 10 hours & 50 minutes (3G). MicroSD card slot up to 64 GB, internal memory 16 GB (12 GB user available), and 1 GB RAM. It has a highly capable face unlock feature which works with the front-facing camera.

The phone has an unlockable bootloader, which allows it to run system software provided not only by LG, but also can run ROMs like CyanogenMod.

== Software ==
LG Optimus 4X HD comes with Android 4.0.3 Ice Cream Sandwich customized with Optimus UI v3.0 and is upgradable to Android 4.1.2 Jelly Bean through the new LG PC suite. It includes Bluetooth 4.0 with A2DP, LE and NFC capability on the handset back cover. It has built in software features such as: SNS integration, TV-out player, MP3/WAV/WMA/eAAC+ player, Organizer, Document editor, Google Search, Google Maps, Gmail, Voice memo/dial/commands and other integrated features. The browser supports HTML5 and Adobe Flash. One key software feature is Quick Memo that lets you capture the screen and draw on it. It also included a lot of capable video features such as: Time Catch Shot, Live Zooming, FingerTip Seek, Thumbnail List Play and Video Speed Control.

Alternatively, custom after-market ROMs are available for the LG optimus 4X HD (LG P880). CyanogenMod 11, based on Google's nexus-style Android 4.4 KitKat, is already available for the phone.

== Design ==
The LG Optimus 4X HD features a rectangular-based design with two chrome-like side trims in the side of the phone (they look like 2 metal lines). The LG Optimus 4X HD has very narrow side bezel, and includes a compact chassis. The LG Optimus 4X HD has a removable back cover to replace batteries. The power button is placed on the top edge of the phone, the volume rocker is near the top left edge. The front of the device is protected with a single piece of Gorilla Glass 1 to prevent scratches and occasional falls. The power button is located at the top right, along with a 3.5mm headset jack on the top left. The micro-USB port is located at the bottom of the smartphone.

== History ==
South Korean electronics company LG introduced 6 new smartphones with new and improved hardware at the Mobile World Congress in 2012, including LG's then flagship phone, the Optimus 4X HD. The LG Optimus 4X HD was officially launched in June 2012. It was originally priced at £454.98 but after 8 months after its initial release its price reduced to £299.92.

== Naming variations ==
- LG P880
- LG P880g (Canada AWS version)

== See also ==
- LG Optimus
- List of LG mobile phones
