= Hub =

A hub is the central part of a wheel that connects the axle to the wheel itself.

Hub, HUB, or hubs may refer to:

== Geography ==
=== Pakistan ===
- Hub District, in Balochistan province of pakistan
  - Hub, Pakistan, capital city of the district
- Hub Dam, in Balochistan
- Hub River, in Balochistan

=== United States ===
- Hub, Mississippi, an unincorporated community

=== Elsewhere ===
- Hub Nunatak, Graham Land, Antarctica
- Hub (Großkarolinenfeld), a borough of Großkarolinenfeld, Bavaria, Germany

== Buildings in the United States ==
- HUB Tower, Des Moines, Iowa
- Hub (Minneapolis, Minnesota), a residential apartment building in Minneapolis
- Hub Building, Burwell, Nebraska, on the National Register of Historic Places

== Organizations ==
- Harvard University Band
- Hogeschool-Universiteit Brussel, Belgium
- HUB International, a North American insurer
- Hub Power Company, first and largest Pakistani Independent Power Producer

== Transport ==
- Airline hub
- Transport hub

== Codes ==
- HUB, Guobiao abbreviation of Hubei, a province of China
- HUB, station code for Hunmanby railway station, Hunmanby, North Yorkshire, England
- hub, ISO 639-3 code for Huambisa language of Peru

== People ==
- Hub (given name), a list of people with the given name or nickname
- Hub (artist), artist and illustrator of Okko magazine
- Hub (bassist), American musician Leonard Nelson Hubbard (c. 1959–2021)
- Hub (wrestler), main ring name of Japanese professional wrestler Yuto Kigawa (born 1978)

== Other uses ==
- Hub (network science)
- Hub (comics), a Marvel Comics character
- Ethernet hub
- USB hub
- Pornhub, a Canadian-owned Internet pornography video-sharing website, one of several owned by adult entertainment conglomerate Aylo
- Discovery Family, formerly "Hub Network", a US cable TV channel
- Kearney Hub, a daily newspaper published in Kearney, Nebraska
- Verizon Hub, a media phone
- Habu, a snake

== See also ==
- The Hub (disambiguation)
- Hub City (disambiguation)
- Visitor center
