= Hub (given name) =

Hub is a given name and a nickname, usually short for Hubert, Hubbard or Herbert. Notable people with the name include:

- Herbert Hub Andrews (1922–2012), American baseball pitcher
- Hubert Hub Anslow (1926–2006), Canadian ice hockey left winger
- Herb Hub Arkush (born 1953), American football sportscaster and analyst
- Hubert Hub Barker (1918–1994), American football linebacker
- Hubert Hub Bechtol (1926–2004), American footballer
- Hubert Hub Collins (1864–1892), American baseball player
- Hubert Hub van Doorne (1900–1979), Dutch businessman
- Hub Gray (died 2018), Canadian military officer and author
- James Henry Hub Hart (1878–1960), American Major League Baseball catcher
- Hubert Hub Kittle (1917–2004), American baseball pitcher, manager, and executive
- Oscar Hub Knolls (1883–1946), American baseball pitcher
- Herbert Hub McCormick (1878–1963), American college football player and military engineer
- Hubert Hub Nelson (1907–1981), American ice hockey player
- Hubbard Hub Northen (1886–1947), American Major League Baseball outfielder
- Herbert Hub Perdue (1882–1968), American baseball pitcher
- Henry Hub Pernoll (1888–1944), American baseball pitcher
- Hubert Hub Pruett (1900–1982), American baseball pitcher
- Hubert Hub Reed (born 1936), American basketball player
- Charles Hubby Hub Shoemake (1899–1984), American football player
- Hubert Hub Ulrich (1920–1974), American football player
- Hub Vinken (1926–2010), Dutch road cyclist
- Herbert Hub Wagner (1904–1992), American football coach
- Harvey Hub Walker (1906–1982), American baseball outfielder
- James Hubert Hub Wilson (1909–1999), Canadian ice hockey player

== See also ==
- Hub (disambiguation)
- Hubby (disambiguation)
