= Asus ZenFone Max (M1) =

Lineup of ASUS smartphones

Asus ZenFone Max (M1) ZB555KL/ZB556KL Asus ZenFone Max Plus (M1) ZB570TL Asus ZenFone Max Pro (M1) ZB601KL/ZB602K
- Brand: ZenFone
- Manufacturer: ASUS
- Type: Max (M1)/Max Plus (M1): Smartphone; Max Pro (M1): Phablet
- Series: ZenFone Max
- First released: Max (M1): February 27, 2018; 8 years ago Max Plus (M1): November 28, 2017; 8 years ago Max Pro (M1): April 23, 2018; 8 years ago
- Predecessor: Asus ZenFone 4 Max
- Successor: Asus ZenFone Max (M2)
- Related: Asus ZenFone 5 Asus ZenFone Live (L1)
- Compatible networks: GSM, 3G, 4G (LTE)
- Form factor: Slate
- Colors: Max (M1): Deepsea Black; Sunlight Gold; Ruby Red; Max Plus (M1): Deepsea Black; Sunlight Gold; Azure Silver; Max Pro (M1): Deepsea Black; Meteor Silver
- Dimensions: Max (M1): H: 147.3 mm; W: 70.9 mm; D: 8.7 mm; Max Plus (M1): H: 152.6 mm; W: 73 mm; D: 8.8 mm; Max Pro (M1): H: 159 mm; W: 76 mm; D: 8.5 mm
- Weight: Max (M1): 150 g Max Plus (M1): 160 g Max Pro (M1): 180 g
- Operating system: Initial: Max (M1): Android 8.0 Oreo + ZenUI 5.0; Max Plus (M1): Android 7.0 Nougat + ZenUI 4.0; Max Pro (M1): Android 8.1 Oreo; Current: Max (M1): Android 8.0 Oreo + ZenUI 5.0; Max Plus (M1): Android 8.1 Oreo + ZenUI 5.0; Max Pro (M1): Android 10
- System-on-chip: Max (M1) (16 GB): Qualcomm MSM8917 Snapdragon 425 (28 nm); Max (M1) (32 GB): Qualcomm MSM8937 Snapdragon 430 (28 nm); Max Plus (M1): MediaTek MT6750T (28 nm); Max Pro (M1): Qualcomm SDM636 Snapdragon 636 (14 nm)
- CPU: Max (M1) (16 GB): Quad-core 1.4 GHz Cortex-A53; Max (M1) (32 GB): Octa-core 1.4 GHz Cortex-A53; Max Plus (M1): Octa-core (4×1.5 GHz Cortex-A53 & 4×1.0 GHz Cortex-A53); Max Pro (M1): Octa-core (4×1.8 GHz Kryo 260 Gold & 4×1.6 GHz Kryo 260 Silver)
- GPU: Max (M1) (16 GB): Adreno 308; Max (M1) (32 GB): Adreno 505; Max Plus (M1): Mali-T860 MP2; Max Pro (M1): Adreno 509
- Memory: Max (M1): 2/3 GB LPDDR3; Max Plus (M1): 2/3/4 GB LPDDR3; Max Pro (M1): 3/4/6 GB LPDDR4X
- Storage: Max (M1): 16/32 GB; Max Plus (M1): 16/32/64 GB; Max Pro (M1): 32/64/128 GB eMMC
- Removable storage: microSDXC: Max (M1)/Max Plus (M1): up to 256 GB; Max Pro (M1): up to 2 TB
- SIM: Dual SIM (Nano-SIM)
- Battery: Non-removable Li-Po: Max (M1): 4000 mAh; Max Plus (M1): 4130 mAh; Max Pro (M1): 5000 mAh
- Charging: 10 W
- Rear camera: Max (M1) (ZB555KL): 13 MP, f/2.0 (wide), 1/3.1", 1.12 µm, PDAF + 8 MP, 17 mm (ultrawide) Video: 1080p@30fps; Max (M1) (ZB556KL): 13 MP, f/2.0 (wide), 1/3.1", 1.12 µm, PDAF Video: 1080p@30fps; gyro-EIS; Max Plus (M1): 16 MP, f/2.0, 35 mm, PDAF + 8 MP, 17 mm (ultrawide) Video: 1080p@30fps; gyro-EIS; Max Pro (M1) (3/4 GB RAM): 13 MP, f/2.2, 25 mm (wide), 1.12 µm, PDAF + 5 MP, f/2.4 (depth sensor) Video: 4K@30fps, 1080p@30fps; Max Pro (M1) (6 GB RAM): 16 MP, f/2.0, PDAF + 5 MP, f/2.4 (depth sensor) Video: 4K@30fps, 1080p@30fps; All models: LED flash, HDR, panorama
- Front camera: Max (M1): 8 MP, f/2.0, 25 mm (wide), 1/4", 1.12 µm LED flash; Max (M1) (ZB556KL) (India): 13 MP, f/2.2, 35 mm LED flash; Max Plus (M1): 8 MP, f/2.0, 25 mm (wide), 1/4", 1.12 µm; Max Pro (M1) (3/4 GB RAM): 8 MP, f/2.2, 26 mm (wide), 1 µm LED flash; Max Pro (M1) (6 GB RAM): 16 MP, f/2.2, 26 mm (wide), 1/3.06", 1 µm LED flash; Video: 1080p@30fps
- Display: All models: IPS LCD, 18:9 aspect ratio; Max (M1): 5.45", 1440 × 720 (HD+), 247 ppi; Max Plus (M1): 5.7", 2160 × 1080 (FHD+), 424 ppi; Max Pro (M1): 5.99", 2160 × 1080 (FHD+), 404 ppi
- Sound: Mono loudspeaker
- Connectivity: microUSB 2.0 (OTG), 3.5 mm audio jack Bluetooth: (A2DP, LE): Max (M1) (ZB555KL): 4.2; Max (M1) (ZB556KL)/Max Plus (M1): 4.0; Max Pro (M1): 5.0, NFC (market dependent for Max Pro (M1)), FM radio Wi-Fi 802.11 b/g/n (Wi-Fi Direct); Satellite navigation: Max (M1)/Max Pro (M1): GPS (A-GPS), GLONASS, BeiDou; Max Plus (M1): GPS (A-GPS), GLONASS
- Data inputs: Touchscreen multi-touch, microphone (1 on Max (M1); 2 on Max Plus (M1)/Max Pro(M1)), fingerprint scanner (rear-mounted), accelerometer, gyroscope (Max Pro (M1)), Proximity sensor, compass
- Model: Max (M1): X00PD; Max Plus (M1): X018D; Max Pro (M1): X00TD

The Asus ZenFone Max (M1) (stylized as ASUS Zenfone Max (M1)) is a line of budget and mid-range Android smartphones manufactured, designed and marketed by ASUS as part of the ZenFone smartphone series. It serves as the successor to the Asus ZenFone 4 Max lineup. The standard Asus ZenFone Max (M1) was unveiled on February 27, 2018, the Asus ZenFone Max Plus (M1) on November 28, 2017, and the premium Asus ZenFone Max Pro (M1) on April 23, 2018. All deviced were equipped with a 2.5D curved protective glass.

== Design & build ==
The front panel of all models is made of glass. The body structure differs per variant: the ZenFone Max (M1) has a plastic unibody design, the ZenFone Max Plus (M1) uses aluminum with plastic caps at the top and bottom, and the ZenFone Max Pro (M1) utilizes a plastic frame with a metal aluminum rear plate overlay. All three smartphones feature relatively thin bezels above and below the display for a 2018 device. From the back, the ZenFone Max Plus (M1) resembles the older Asus ZenFone 4 Max series, while the ZenFone Max (M1) and ZenFone Max Pro (M1) align closer with the design language of the ZenFone 5.

For the ZenFone Max (M1), the bottom houses a microUSB port along with microphone and speaker grilles; a 3.5 mm audio jack sits on top; the left side holds a triple card slot (2 Nano-SIMs + microSD card), and the right side contains the volume rocker and power key. The ZenFone Max Plus (M1) matches this layout but adds a secondary noise-canceling microphone on the top edge.

The ZenFone Max Pro (M1) rearranges elements by placing both the microUSB port, 3.5 mm audio jack, primary microphone, and loudspeaker on the bottom panel. A secondary microphone sits on top, the left side houses the card tray, and the right side features the hardware buttons.

The rear side of all models features a vertical or horizontal camera layout, an LED flash, and a centered fingerprint scanner. The front panel includes the earpiece speaker, front-facing camera, ambient light sensor, and proximity sensor. The standard and Pro variants also include a front-facing LED flash.

The smartphones were available in the following color options:

ZenFone Max (M1)		ZenFone Max Plus (M1)		ZenFone Max Pro (M1)	
Color	Name	Color	Name	Color	Name
	Deepsea Black		Deepsea Black		Deepsea Black
	Sunlight Gold		Sunlight Gold		Meteor Silver
	Ruby Red		Azure Silver		

== Specifications ==
=== Hardware and platform ===
The 16 GB storage variant of the ZenFone Max (M1) runs on a Qualcomm Snapdragon 425 system-on-chip, whereas the 32 GB version uses a Snapdragon 430. The ZenFone Max Plus (M1) is powered by a MediaTek MT6750T SoC, and the high-tier ZenFone Max Pro (M1) handles tasks via a Qualcomm Snapdragon 636.

=== Battery ===
The internal battery capacity scales up across the models: the ZenFone Max (M1) has a 4000 mAh capacity, the ZenFone Max Plus (M1) has a 4130 mAh capacity, and the ZenFone Max Pro (M1) scales up to a bigger 5000 mAh capacity.

=== Camera ===
The ZenFone Max (M1) features a 13 MP main wide-angle lens with an aperture of f/2.0 and phase-detection autofocus (PDAF). The ZB555KL variant includes a secondary 8 MP ultra-wide lens, which is missing from the ZB556KL SKU. The Indian version of the ZenFone Max (M1) ZB555KL features a 13 MP selfie camera with a f/2.2 aperture, while global models feature an 8 MP camera with a f/2.2 opening.

The ZenFone Max Plus (M1) uses a dual rear module containing a 16 MP sensor with a f/2.0 aperture and PDAF alongside an 8 MP ultra-wide lens. Front-facing capture is managed by an 8 MP wide lens with a f/2.0 aperture.

The premium ZenFone Max Pro (M1) features different sensors based on storage configs: the 6 GB RAM tier uses a 16 MP main shooter with a f/2.0 aperture and PDAF, while lower tiers feature a 13 MP primary lens with a f/2.2 aperture. Both configurations utilize a secondary 5 MP sensor with a f/2.4 aperture for depth calculation. The 6 GB RAM tier uses a 16 MP front shooter with a f/2.2 aperture, while the remaining versions drop down to an 8 MP sensor with a f/2.2 aperture.

Video capture on the ZenFone Max (M1) and Max Plus (M1), along with the front shooters of the Pro version, is limited to 1080p at 30fps. The rear setup on the ZenFone Max Pro (M1) can capture up to 4K video at 30fps.

=== Display ===
Every variant sports an IPS LCD assembly with a modern elongated 18:9 aspect ratio. The standard ZenFone Max (M1) features a 5.45" screen at HD+ resolution (1440 × 720) yielding a 247 ppi density. The ZenFone Max Plus (M1) features a 5.7" display with a Full HD+ resolution (2160 × 1080) at 424 ppi, and the ZenFone Max Pro (M1) stretches to a 5.99" display using Full HD+ resolution (2160 × 1080) at 404 ppi.

=== Memory and storage ===
The smartphones were distributed in several memory and storage configurations:

Configuration		Model		
Storage	RAM	ZenFone Max (M1)	ZenFone Max Plus (M1)	ZenFone Max Pro (M1)
16 GB	2 GB	Yes	Yes	No
32 GB	2 GB	Yes	No	No
32 GB	3 GB	Yes	Yes	Yes
64 GB	4 GB	No	Yes	Yes
64 GB	6 GB	No	No	Yes
128 GB	4 GB	No	No	Yes

Internal storage on the ZenFone Max (M1) and Max Plus (M1) can be expanded using a dedicated microSD card slot up to 256 GB, whereas the ZenFone Max Pro (M1) supports cards up to 2 TB.

=== Software ===
The ZenFone Max (M1) originally launched with Android 8.0 Oreo running the ZenUI 5.0 skin overlay. The ZenFone Max Plus (M1) launched with an older Android 7.0 Nougat codebase and ZenUI 4.0 overlay, while the ZenFone Max Pro (M1) shipped with a clean, close-to-stock version of Android 8.1 Oreo without an ASUS user interface skin. The ZenFone Max Plus (M1) was subsequently upgraded to Android 8.1 Oreo with ZenUI 5.0, and the ZenFone Max Pro (M1) received updates up to Android 10.

== Reception ==
=== ZenFone Max M1 ===
In terms of processing power, the Max M1 is equipped with a quad-core central processing unit (CPU) that provides consistent operational speeds, ensuring the device maintains stability during standard use without significant latency. GSMArena noted that the device's performance is highly competitive within its price bracket. Consequently, the handset is frequently categorized as an ideal entry-level smartphone, particularly suited for consumers transitioning from feature phones or those purchasing their first smartphone.

=== ZenFone Max Plus M1 ===
In independent testing, the ZenFone Max Plus M1 received criticism for its biometric security systems and thermal performance. TechRadar reviewer Mark Knapp noted that the device's fingerprint scanner exhibited frequent recognition failures, often requiring users to manually input a standard unlock pattern after multiple failed attempts. Additionally, while the smartphone included facial recognition technology, the implementation lacked a real-time viewfinder on the lock screen, making it difficult for users to properly align the front-facing camera. Even when alignment was achieved, the facial recognition system was reported to be highly inconsistent and prone to regular failure. Beyond biometric concerns, the device demonstrated notable thermal management issues during evaluation. The smartphone frequently generated significant heat under minimal load, and testing indicated that the phone would become noticeably warm even while idle or carried in a pocket. According to data from the pre-installed PowerMaster utility application, the device's internal temperature routinely exceeded 90 °F (approx. 32 °C) during periods of inactivity with no applications actively running, raising concerns regarding its power efficiency and passive cooling capabilities.

== See also ==
- Asus ZenFone
- Asus ZenFone 4 Max
- Asus ZenFone Max (M2)

Preceded by Asus ZenFone 4 Max	Asus ZenFone Max (M1); 2018	Succeeded by Asus ZenFone Max (M2)
Preceded by Asus ZenFone 4 Max Plus	Asus ZenFone Max Plus (M1); 2017	Succeeded by Asus ZenFone Max Plus (M2)
Preceded by Asus ZenFone 4 Max Pro	Asus ZenFone Max Pro (M1); 2018	Succeeded by Asus ZenFone Max Pro (M2)
