= LG Vu 3 =

Smartphone model

LG Optimus VU 3
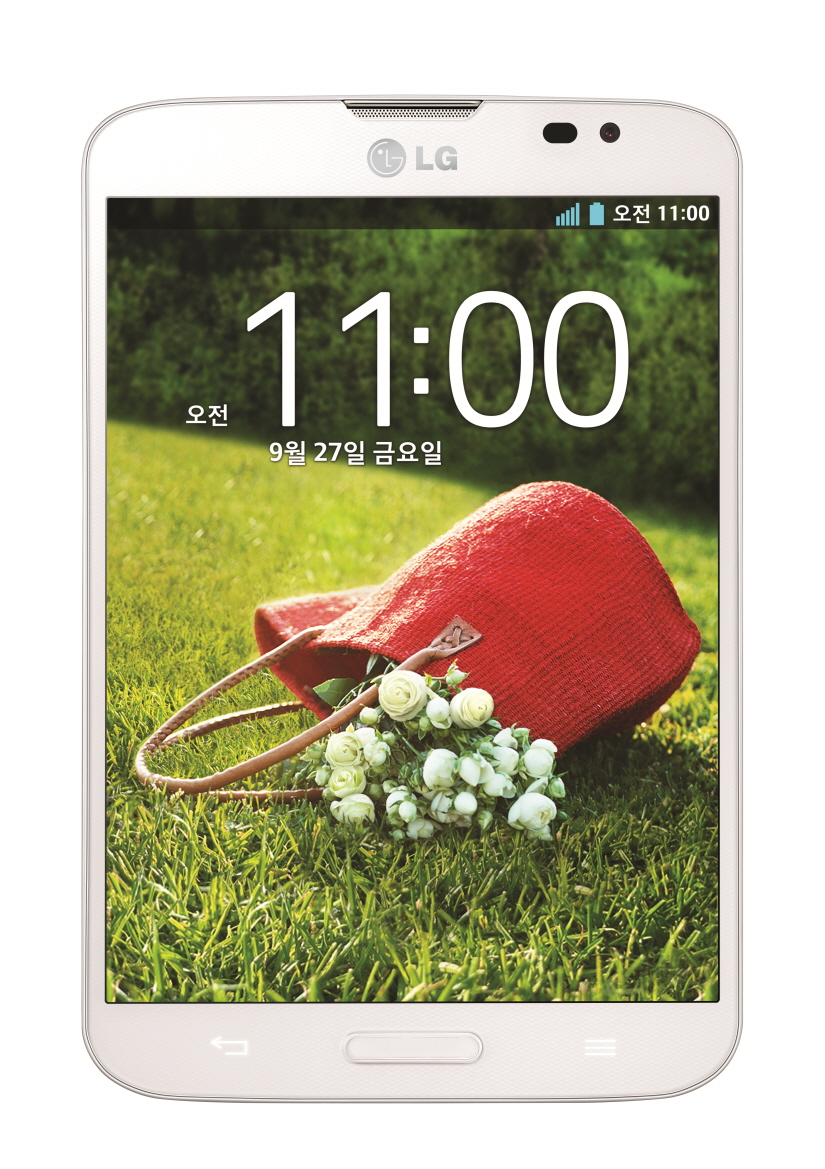
- Type: Phablet
- Series: Vu
- First released: September 27 2013 (KR)
- Predecessor: LG Optimus Vu II
- Successor: LG V10
- Related: LG G2; LG G Pad 8.3; Samsung Galaxy Note 3
- Compatible networks: GSM/GPRS/EDGE; 850, 900, 1800, 1900 MHz; 3G UMTS/HSPA+ 900, 2100 MHz / 850, 2100 MHz 4G LTE 800 MHz
- Form factor: Slate
- Dimensions: H 132.1 mm W 85.6 mm D 9.4 mm
- Weight: 161 g (6 oz)
- Operating system: Original: Android 4.2.2 "Jelly Bean"; Current: Android 4.4.2 "KitKat"
- CPU: Krait 400 Quad-core 2.26 GHz
- GPU: Adreno 300
- Memory: 2 GB RAM
- Storage: 16 GB
- Removable storage: None
- Battery: 2,610 mAh
- Rear camera: 13 MP, 1080p at 60 FPS video
- Front camera: 2.1 MP
- Display: 5.2-inch (960×1280) IPS LCD (308 ppi)
- Connectivity: Wi-Fi 802.11 a/b/g/n, Wi-Fi Hotspot, DLNA, Bluetooth 4.0 + A2DP; NFC
- Data inputs: Touch

The LG Optimus VU 3 is an Android phablet smartphone released in September 2013 and noted for its 5.2-inch screen size—between that of conventional smartphones, and larger tablets. It is powered by a 2.26 GHz quad-core Krait 400 CPU with Adreno 330 GPU and runs on Android 4.2.2 Jelly Bean. Android 4.4.2 KitKat was also announced for update on 14 March, 2014.

== See also ==
- LG Optimus
- LG Vu series
- List of LG mobile phones
