= LG Optimus Vu II =

Smartphone model by LG

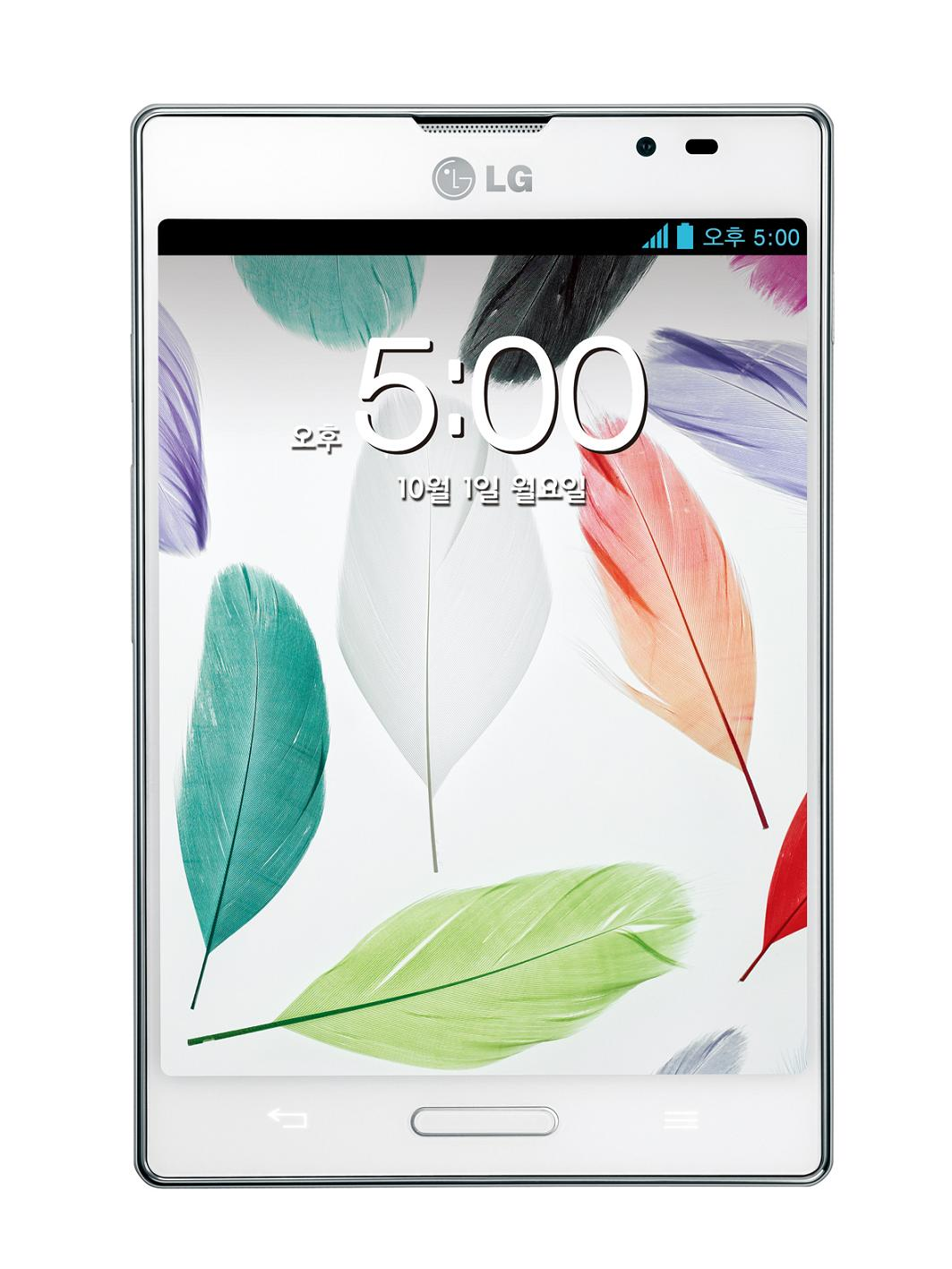
- Brand: LG
- Manufacturers: LG Electronics, Inc.
- Type: Phablet
- Series: Optimus; Vu
- First released: September 27, 2012 (KR)
- Predecessor: LG Optimus Vu
- Successor: LG Vu 3
- Related: LG Optimus G LG Optimus G Pro; Samsung Galaxy Note II
- Compatible networks: GSM/GPRS/EDGE; 850, 900, 1800, 1900 MHz; 3G UMTS/HSPA+ 900, 2100 MHz / 850, 2100 MHz 4G LTE 800 MHz
- Form factor: Slate
- Dimensions: H 132.2 mm W 85.6 mm D 9.4 mm
- Weight: 159 g (6 oz)
- Operating system: Original: Android 4.0.4 "Ice Cream Sandwich"; Current: Android 4.4.2 "KitKat"
- CPU: Krait Dual-core 1.5 GHz
- GPU: Adreno 225
- Memory: 2 GB RAM
- Storage: 32 GB
- Removable storage: 32 GB
- Battery: 2,150 mAh
- Rear camera: 8 MP, 1080p at 30 FPS video
- Front camera: 1.3 MP
- Display: 5.0-inch (768×1024) IPS LCD (256 ppi)
- Connectivity: Wi-Fi 802.11 a/b/g/n, Wi-Fi Hotspot, DLNA, Bluetooth 4.0 + A2DP; NFC
- Data inputs: Touch

The LG Optimus Vu II (Also known as LG Vu 2 in South Korea) is an Android phablet smartphone released in September 2012 and noted for its 5.0-inch screen size—between that of conventional smartphones, and larger tablets. It is powered by a 1.5 GHz dual-core Krait CPU with Adreno 225 GPU and runs on Android 4.0.4 Ice Cream Sandwich, which is upgradable to Android 4.4.2 KitKat.

== See also ==
- LG Optimus
- LG Vu series
- List of LG mobile phones
