= LG Intuition =

Mobile phone model

- Also known as: LG Optimus Vu
- Manufacturer: LG Electronics
- Type: Smartphone
- First released: September 2012
- Dimensions: 139.7 mm (5.50 in) H 90.4 mm (3.56 in) W 8.4 mm (0.33 in) D
- Weight: 168.1 g (5.93 oz)
- Operating system: Android 4.0.4 (Ice Cream Sandwich)
- Memory: 32 GB internal, 1 GB RAM
- Battery: Lithium-Polymer battery 2,080 mAh; Internal rechargeable Lithium-Polymer battery
- Rear camera: List: 8.0 megapixels; LED flash; HD video (1080p) at 30 frames/s; Autofocus; Smile and face detection; Image stabilization
- Front camera: 1.3 MP
- Display: List: 5 in (130 mm) diagonal with 4:3 aspect ratio; HD-IPS LCD touchscreen; 1024x768 pixels (256 ppi), RGB Stripe (3 subpixels/pixel); 16M colors
- Website: LG Intuition VS950

The LG Intuition is a cell phone manufactured by LG Electronics. It is Verizon's version of the LG Optimus Vu. It is considered by some to be a phablet due to its 5-inch screen size. Its operating system is Android 4.0.4. The phone is rootable. CyanogenMod, an operating system is as of yet incompatible with the phone.
