= Question (character) =

DC Comics superhero

The Question
- The Question (vol. 2) #3 (March 2005), art by Tommy Lee Edwards.

Publication information
- Publisher: Charlton Comics; DC Comics
- First appearance: Blue Beetle (vol. 4) #1 (June 1967)
- Created by: Steve Ditko

In-story information
- Alter ego: Charles Victor Szasz / Victor Sage
- Place of origin: Hub City, Illinois
- Team affiliations: Justice League; L.A.W. Black Lantern Corps; Suicide Squad
- Abilities: Use of pseudoderm mask; Genius-level intelligence; Master detective and journalist; Skilled martial artist, stealth and hand-to-hand combatant; Mystical powers derived from zen buddhism and urban shamanism

The Question is a name used by several superheroes appearing in American comic books published by DC Comics. Created by Steve Ditko, the Question first appeared in Charlton Comics' Blue Beetle #1 (June 1967), and was acquired by DC Comics in the early 1980s and incorporated into the DC Universe. As conceived by Ditko, the Question was an adherent of Objectivism during his career as a Charlton hero, much like Ditko's earlier creation, Mr. A. In the 1987–1990 solo series from DC, the character developed a Zen-like philosophy. Since then, various writers have added their own philosophical stances to the Question.

The Question's secret identity has been both Victor "Vic" Sage and Charles Victor Szasz, the latter introduced retroactively later in his publication history; a television reporter who doubles as a vigilante, the character is a relentless crime-fighter in both his public and vigilante persona known for following his conscience even if it means breaking the law and concealing his identity. Subjected to a comic book death, the character has also been revived since, acting as an investigator for the Justice League and works concurrently with his protege and successor, Renee Montoya, who uses the codename simultaneously. For a time following the New 52 relaunch, the Question was reintroduced as an unknown mystical entity and Sage as a government agent, before being restored to his traditional detective persona and name after the events of DC Rebirth.

The Vic Sage incarnation of Question has appeared in various media outside comics, including television series and films. Jeffrey Combs, Nicholas Guest, and David Kaye have voiced the character in animation.

== Publication history ==
In 1967, Steve Ditko created the character of Mr. A as an undiluted expression of his values, ethics and Objectivist philosophy. Later that year, Ditko was hired by Charlton Comics to revive their superhero character Blue Beetle. Due to their below-average per-page payment rates to artists, Charlton gave more creative freedom to artists who pursued offbeat or idiosyncratic ideas. Ditko created the Question as a less-radical version of Mr. A who could be acceptable to the Comics Code Authority. The character was included as a back-pages feature in the new Blue Beetle comic book.

However, Charlton discontinued its "action hero" line in December 1967 after only four issues of Blue Beetle had been published. A three-part Question story, which Ditko had already penciled, appeared in the one-shot comic book Mysterious Suspense (October 1968). The fifth and final issue of Blue Beetle, featuring the Question, was published in November of the same year. In 1985, after DC Comics had acquired the right to Charlton's characters, the Question reappeared in Crisis on Infinite Earths. In February 1987, DC launched a new The Question comic book, scripted by Dennis O'Neil and penciled by Denys Cowan. This series, which ran for 36 regular issues and two annuals, was replaced in September 1990 by The Question Quarterly, which ran for five issues. Since then, the Question has remained a recurring character of the DC Universe. A six-issue The Question limited series was published by DC in 2005. A four-issue limited series titled The Question: The Deaths of Vic Sage was published under the DC Black Label imprint beginning in 2019, written by Jeff Lemire and penciled by Cowen and covers by Bill Sienkiewicz.

Aside from appearing in his own titles, The Question has appeared sporadically in DC comics and media and has undergone several reboots.

== Fictional character biography ==
=== Charlton Comics ===
Based in Hub City, Vic Sage made his mark as an outspoken and aggressive investigative journalist. Not long after starting his TV appearances, he began to investigate Dr. Arby Twain.

Mysterious Suspense #1 (October 1968), Charlton Comics; cover art by Steve Ditko.

Sage was approached by Aristotle Rodor, his former professor, currently a scientist. Rodor told Sage about an artificial skin he had co-developed with Dr. Twain called Pseudoderm. Pseudoderm was intended to work as an applied skin-like bandage with the help of a bonding gas, but it had unforeseen toxicity which was sometimes fatal when applied to open wounds. Rodor and Twain agreed to abandon the project and parted ways, but Professor Rodor discovered that Dr. Twain had decided to proceed with an illegal sale of the invention to Third World nations, regardless of the risk to human health.

Sage resolved to stop him but had no way of going after Dr. Twain without exposing himself. Rodor suggested that Sage use a mask made of Pseudoderm to cover his famous features. Armed with information, and more importantly a disguise, Sage eventually caught up with Dr. Twain, stopping the transaction and extracting a confession, then leaving Twain bound in Pseudoderm. On television, Sage reported on Dr. Twain's illegal activities.

Sage decided that this new identity would be useful for future investigations, and partnered with Professor Rodor, who supplied the Pseudoderm and eventually modified the bonding gas to change the color of Sage's hair and clothing. The two men became good friends, with Sage affectionately referring to Rodor as "Tot".

Compared to other superhero characters of the Silver Age of Comic Books, The Question was more ruthless in his methods. For example, when he was fighting some criminals in a sewer and knocked them into a deep and fast-moving water flow, he declined to pull them out despite their real danger of drowning. Instead, he left to notify the police to retrieve them in case they survived the ordeal.

The Question's most frequent foe was Max Bine, a.k.a. Banshee. Introduced in Blue Beetle (vol. 4) #2 (June 1967), Bine was the apprentice of a circus performer named the Flying Dundo. After designing a cape that enabled the wearer to fly, Dundo was slain by his pupil and Max Bine became the costumed Banshee, using his mentor's invention to terrorize towns he crossed. The Banshee met his match when he reached Crown City and sparred with the Question on several occasions.

The Question briefly appeared alongside his fellow Charlton "Action Heroes" as part of the Sentinels of Justice published by AC Comics.

=== DC Comics ===
The Charlton characters were acquired by DC Comics while the former company was in decline in 1983. The Question appeared briefly in 1985's Crisis On Infinite Earths and in a three-issue arc of DC's Blue Beetle revival.

==== O'Neil series ====
DC gave the Question his own solo series in 1987, written by Dennis O'Neil and primarily drawn by Denys Cowan. The series was published for 36 issues, two annuals, and five "Quarterly" specials. In The Question #1, the Question was defeated in personal combat, first by the martial arts mercenary Lady Shiva. He was then beaten severely by the villain's hired thugs, shot in the head with a pellet gun, and thrown into the river to drown. Lady Shiva then rescued him and gave him directions to meet Richard Dragon, who uses a wheelchair, as soon as he recovered enough to get out of bed. Once there, Sage learned both martial arts and eastern philosophy. When he returned to the city, he resumed his journalist and superhero careers with adventures that tended to illustrate various philosophic points. To further illustrate those ideas, Dennis O'Neil had a reading recommendation in the letters page of each issue.

In the O'Neil series, Vic Sage is an investigative reporter for the news station KBEL in Hub City. He uses the identity of the Question to get the answers his civilian identity cannot. Unlike other vigilante superheroes, O'Neil's Question is primarily focused on the politics of his city, and rather than hunting down the perpetrators of petty theft, he tends to fight the corrupt government of Hub City. O'Neil's Hub City is noted as being "synonymous with venality, corruption, and violence", perhaps even surpassing Gotham City as the most dismal city in the DC Universe version of the US.

For the majority of the series, Vic Sage is covertly assisting the good-hearted Myra Fermin to win the seat of Hub City Mayor. His interest in Myra extends beyond admiration, as the two shared a relationship before his near-death experience with Lady Shiva and his training under Richard Dragon. Upon his return, he discovers she has married the corrupt drunkard and mayor of Hub City, Wesley Fermin. Despite Myra's losing the election by one vote, she becomes mayor when her competition is found dead as a result of what is called "the worst tornado in history". At her victory speech, her husband Wesley shoots her for supporting what he believes to be Communist beliefs, putting her into a coma and sending Hub City further into chaos with no government and no police force. Sage dons the guise of the Question, acting as the city's only form of justice for a short while before the mayor wakes from her coma. Gang warfare in the weeks following the election leads Sage to Lady Shiva, first as a combatant, and then enlisting her help as an ally of sorts to get in a position to talk to the gang leaders. As Myra adjusts into her role as mayor of Hub City, she and Sage begin to rekindle their relationship, though Myra tells Sage she will not act on her feelings until she leaves office. Despite their long-term friendship, she never connects that Sage and "the man without a face" are one and the same until the end of his time at Hub City.

O'Neil's Question is conflicted on how far to go in enforcing justice, often feeling tempted to kill. He resists this temptation during his time in Hub City, realizing that part of his desire to go so far is just to see what it feels like to take a life. His relationship with his mentor, Aristotle Rodor, is one of many things that keep him from going over the edge and back towards the darkness he had shown in his youth on the streets of Hub City.

Eventually, during a hallucinogenic trip, his subconscious tells him through images of his mother that he has to leave Hub City to ever be able to live happily. This viewpoint is bolstered by the societal collapse of the city. Around the same time, Richard Dragon comes to see Vic, as Richard has sensed that Vic is on the verge of a major turning point in his life, and convinces Vic that living in Hub City is killing him. In an agreement with Richard, Lady Shiva arrives with a helicopter to usher The Question and Aristotle Rodor away, at which point she decides to stay in Hub City and embrace the chaos. Vic nearly convinces Myra to come with him and escape the chaos of the city. Myra remembers the people of the city who need her, mainly the children. She leaves Jackie, her mentally handicapped daughter, in Sage's care and goes back to do what she can.

After leaving Hub City, Vic takes Jackie with him to South America, hoping to rid himself of his "No Face" alter ego and find a land free of the clutter and corruption that filled Hub City. However, Vic quickly gets drawn into a drug war which ultimately forces him to kill to save Jackie's life.

Jackie becomes ill and Sage returns with her to Hub City. Despite medical care, Jackie dies.

The Question Annual #2 retroactively altered the character's origin by revealing that Sage was an orphan who was left on the steps of a Catholic church as a baby. He was named Charles Victor Szasz by the nuns who found him, and later changed his name to Vic Sage after becoming a television reporter. As a youth he developed a reputation as a troublemaker, and prided himself on defiantly enduring the physical abuse of the orphanage where he was housed. He eventually managed to get into college where he studied journalism, but his higher learning did not mellow his violent tendencies, such as when he beat up his pusher for giving him LSD which caused the frightening experience of doubting his own senses under its influence.

==== Minor Appearances ====
After O'Neil's series, the Question guest starred in various other DC titles. He appeared as a main character in the 1991 The Brave and the Bold mini-series together with Green Arrow and John Butcher fighting against a terrorist organization and a radical Native American movement, as well as being a member of L.A.W. (Living Assault Weapons) in 1999 together with other Charlton Comics characters Blue Beetle, Judomaster, Captain Atom, Peacemaker, Nightshade, and Sarge Steel against a godlike villain known as the Avatar. He also teamed up with antihero Azrael against a former Question villain in a story created again by O'Neil and Cowan.

During the "Cry for Blood" Huntress arc and other smaller appearances surrounding it, the Question was active in Gotham City, during which time he expressed an interest in Huntress, both romantically and in her development as a crimefighter. In an attempt to help her find peace, he takes her to his old mentor to undergo the same training he himself underwent in the O'Neil series but is frustrated by Huntress' continued acceptance of killing as a solution.

Huntress later worked closely with Sage's successor as the Question, Renee Montoya, and is saddened to hear of Sage's death. She credits him with "saving her from herself", and misses him.

==== Veitch miniseries ====
The 2005 Question mini-series, authored by Rick Veitch, reimagines the character as a self-taught urban shaman whose brutal and at times lethal treatment of enemies arises from a warrior ethos, rather than Objectivist philosophy. The Question "walks in two worlds" when sent into visionary trances by Rodor's gas, now retconned as a hallucinogen. In these trances, cities (Chicago, where he is a TV anchor, and then Metropolis, where the series takes him) "speak" to him through visual coincidences and overheard snatches of street conversation. Regarding himself as a spiritual warrior, he is now comfortable killing his enemies when this seems useful and poetically just. He uses his skills and his alternative moral code first to detect and then to foil a plot by Lex Luthor not only to assassinate Superman but to prevent his return from the dead by damning his soul upon death. Sage is revealed to have a lifelong infatuation with fellow journalist Lois Lane, which he does not divulge to her. Superman accepts the Question's visionary drug use, and expresses gratitude for his assistance, but forces him to leave the city after several unheeded warnings about killing, and also after noticing Sage's attraction to Lane.

==== 52 ====
In 52, Sage recruits and trains Renee Montoya as his replacement before dying of lung cancer. In this incarnation, he is wry, cheerful, and avuncular, although still enigmatic. He displays no discernible philosophical commitments, aside from a determination to recruit Montoya and to have her decide who she is and who she will become. In Blackest Night, Sage temporarily returns as a Black Lantern.

==== The New 52 ====
In September 2011, The New 52 rebooted DC's continuity. In the new timeline, two versions of Vic Sage exist on the main New 52 DC Universe Earth. Additionally, a different version of the Question existed, being re-imagined as a mystical enigma instead of a supernatural-esque detective.

==== Suicide Squad Vic Sage ====
A new version of Vic sage resurfaces as a government agent recruited from the private sector to co-run the Suicide Squad with Amanda Waller. Sage is a corrupt, amoral bureaucrat who sees the Suicide Squad serving as a go-to sabotage group; engaging in wetwork assignments against foreign corporate interests under the guise of regular super-villain carnage. He also seeks to "improve" the group; dismissive of Harley Quinn and Deadshot, he recruits Deathstroke and Joker's Daughter as their replacements. He also recruits Black Manta into the group too and alters his helmet so that every person he sees is Aquaman to motivate him into being a more prolific killer. Deathstroke and Joker's Daughter betray the team on their first mission headed by both Sage and Waller. Sage panics and attempts to kill the entire team to prevent the mutiny from exposing the Squad. Waller prevents this from happening and in response to his actions, Waller has Sage banished from having any active say over mission and membership selection. Sage responds by agreeing to work with a corrupt multi-national corporation, which seeks to exploit the new objectives of the team to eliminate business rivals and whistleblowers. Sage arranges for Waller to be demoted to field commander, forcing Waller and the team to go AWOL to get proof of Sage and his corporate backers' agenda. In the end, Waller agrees to give the multi-national corporation a pass in exchange for them betraying their patsy. Vic Sage is then arrested, but not before he murders Waller's assistant who tries to stop Sage from killing Waller after learning his corporate allies sold him out to save themselves.

==== DC Rebirth/DC Universe ====
Following Infinite Frontier after the event Doomsday Clock, Vic Sage as Question was re-established with his previous character history and a member of the Suicide Squad and later Checkmate. The two heroes who go by the name The Question were reintroduced in the Event Leviathan miniseries by Brian Michael Bendis. Lois Lane created two detective teams to investigate the major suspects for the secret identity of a new villain, codename Leviathan. The first one contained Vic Sage, the original Question; the second, secret team, was later revealed to be headed up by the second Question, Renee Montoya. Sage and Montoya have a heartfelt reunion in Lois Lane #3.

The Question and Batman also had a team-up in Batman: Urban Legends #14. In this story, the Question asked the assistance of Batman to investigate a conspiracy theory in Gotham City relating to Wayne Enterprises. The two had a brief struggle after the Question began framing Bruce Wayne of financial fraud, forcing the Batman to reveal his secret identity to the Question. The story ends with the Question revealing that he planned the meeting to prove Wayne was Batman.

== Powers and abilities ==
The Question is also a talented and intuitive detective, honed by years of experience as an investigative journalist. Though shown not to be on par with Batman, the Question has solved mysteries, infiltrated enemy territory, and used his intellect to outwit master criminals like the Riddler. Throughout the years, beginning with Dennis O'Neil and further explored by Rick Veitch, the Question has possessed mystical and supernatural abilities. He can mentally enhance the healing of injuries, sense danger, block pain, communicate with spirits, locate enemies and create astral projections. All of these abilities allow the Question to face powerful and superhuman opponents.

The Question is an almost superhuman vigilante armed with his iconic pseudoderm mask, fedora and trench coat. The pseudoderm mask gives the Question the appearance of someone without a face, which is useful for scaring people, has slight protection against damage, and is moldable enough for use in disguises. The Question is also armed with a binary gas that he can summon from his belt, gloves, or calling cards, which can change the appearance of his hair and costume, be used as a smokescreen, and amplify his shamanistic powers.

== Other versions ==
=== Narcissus ===
This version of the Question was the incarnation introduced following the New 52, complete with a different origin, reimagined as a mystical enigma; he is a mysterious man who stood trial by the Circle of Eternity (headed by a younger Wizard Shazam) for misuse of magic on Earth and is punished by erasing his face, rendering him blind and mute. They then erased his memory and teleported him to the 21st century to spend the rest of his existence tormented by his disfigurement, forgotten, and not knowing who he was. This version of resurfaced during the Trinity of Sin storyline, where he is shown investigating the Secret Society of Super-Villains. Having regained his ability to speak and see, this version of Question (initially) speaks only in questions and believes that his true identity can be restored if he can stop the Secret Society and its backers, Crime Syndicate of America members Outsider (Earth-3's Alfred Pennyworth) and triple agent Atomica. When Atomica manipulates Superman into murdering Doctor Light by triggering his heat vision power by stabbing his brain with a sliver of kryptonite, Question breaks into the facility where Superman is being held. Using a gas mask-based setup similar to the one used by Nemesis, Question impersonates Steve Trevor and frees Superman, while presenting a lead towards who caused Superman to kill Doctor Light. The lead turns out to be a dead end, but it places Question in with the various Justice League factions when Pandora attempts to seek their help to open the skull-shaped box that various forces are coveting.

During the battle between the League factions that ensues for the box, Pandora rejects Question's desire to open the box and possibly learn his true identity. She implies that Question would be a threat to all if he ever had his memory and identity restored. The battle between the various Leagues ends when Atomica reveals her true nature and helps Outsider open the skull box, which in truth was a pocket dimension containing the rest of the Crime Syndicate. Freed, the Crime Syndicate imprisoned this version of the Question along with the bulk of the Justice League, Justice League of America, and Justice League Dark inside the Firestorm matrix. Question and the rest of the League were freed once the Crime Syndicate and Secret Society were defeated by a group of villains united by Lex Luthor. The character was then featured in the six-part mini-series "Trinity of Sin", but only featured in a supporting role, where he was constantly complaining about how Pandora and Phantom Stranger did not care about helping him find out his true identity. This version of the Question was last seen in Trinity of Sin #6, the final issue of the series and his true identity was later revealed to be Narcissus by Geoff Johns.

=== Alternate universe versions ===
- In the final issue of 52 (2007), a new DC Multiverse is revealed, originally consisting of 52 alternate realities, including a new "Earth-4". While this new world resembles the pre-Crisis Earth-Four, including unnamed characters who look like the Question and the Charlton characters, writer Grant Morrison has stated this is not the pre-Crisis Earth-Four. Describing the conception of Earth-4, Grant Morrison alluded that its interpretation of Vic Sage would resemble the classic Charlton incarnation, with tones borrowed from Rorschach and Watchmen. A number of other alternate universes in the 52 Multiverse may also contain versions of the Question from DC Comics previous Elseworlds stories or from variant "themed" universes, such as the sex-reversed world of Earth-11.
- In Grant Morrison's Multiversity series, the Vic Sage/Question is one of the core protagonists in Pax Americana, an issue of that limited series set in the New 52's Earth 4 continuity, along with the Blue Beetle, Peacemaker, Nightshade, and Captain Atom.
- On Earth-9, "The Question" is the name of a global surveillance network.
- An alternate timeline version of the Question appears in Flashpoint as a member of the Resistance.
- An alternate universe version of the Question appears in the DC Black Label limited series The Question: The Deaths of Vic Sage, written by Jeff Lemire and penciled by Denys Cowen, with covers by Bill Sienkiewicz.
- The Question appears in DC x Sonic the Hedgehog: Metal Legion #2, in which he became detective partners with Vector the Crocodile.

== Characterization ==
=== Philosophy ===
The Question has become iconic in comic books for having a long history of being incorporated with various philosophical stances, courtesy of the various writers who wrote him. When Steve Ditko created him in the 1960s, he used the Question to convey his objectivist beliefs, a philosophy from Ayn Rand that states that morality should be objective. This made the Question an uncompromising and merciless vigilante. When Dennis O'Neil began writing the character in the 1980s, he rewrote the Question, mellowing him down and changing him from being a brutal superhero to one who followed Zen Buddhism. O'Neil was knowledgeable of Eastern philosophy from reading literature such as Zen and the Art of Motorcycle Maintenance and he wrote the Question to be a more meditative and world-weary hero.

The Question continued to slide in between violence and meditation until Rick Veitch gave the Question a more mystical, urban shamanistic characterization in 2005. Veitch had already used magic and occultism during his tenure on Swamp Thing, where in one issue, he referenced French journalists Pauwels and Bergier's 1960 occult treatise, The Morning of the Magicians. He incorporated those characteristics in the Question. At one point in the comic, Veitch also referenced Friedrich Nietzsche's Übermensch. When Greg Rucka wrote the character in the series 52, he revised Sage's characterisation, giving him a more positivist but fatalistic outlook and a jovial personality.

Outside the canon DC Comics, different mediums and series have different interpretations and portrayals of the character. Justice League Unlimited portrays the Question as a paranoid and cynical conspiracy theorist. This portrayal became a hit amongst fans, becoming a part of the canonicity of the character later on in Batman: Urban Legends #14. Frank Miller wrote a version of the character in 2001 who was a libertarian and anti-authoritarian spokesperson, dwelling as well into conspiracies, manifestos, and technophobia.

== Reception ==
Throughout his long history, the Question has been received well by both critics and consumers. Jamie Lovett from Comic Book ranked the character #3 in his "5 Greatest Detectives In Comics", stating, "Every mystery begins by asking the question, and no one knows that better than the Question himself." Carl Hannigan from Vocal ranked the character and his comics at #1 in his "Top 5 Most Unique Superhero Comics You've Never Heard Of", stating that his varying philosophies is a "character trait [that] makes the Question so special when it comes to comic book history. Even with all the different philosophies and personalities the Question went through in his history, the one thing that remained consistent is his ability to mold himself into whatever the writers want him to be."

Timothy Donohoo from Comic Book Resources considered the character to be the most underrated street-level character in DC Comics, stating that he was more grounded and realistic than others of his kind like Batman and Green Arrow, and that "Sage is also unique among comic book heroes in that he is meant to embody a certain mindset or philosophy." Ewan Paterson from WhatCulture praised O'Neil's run, saying "[his] and Cowan's reappraisal of the classic Steve Ditko creation ranks among the finest DC works of all time, and one more than deserving of the kind of status more commonly associated with the likes of Frank Miller's Daredevil, O'Neil and Neal Adams' Batman, or even their run on Green Arrow too."

=== Homages ===
- Rorschach: Alan Moore's comic book series Watchmen was originally planned to use a number of Charlton Comics characters, including the Question. When DC, the owner of the characters, found out that he intended to kill the Question, along with a number of the other characters, he was asked to make new characters. The Question became Rorschach.
  - In The Question #17, Vic picks up a copy of Watchmen to read on a trip and initially sees Rorschach as being quite cool. After Vic is beaten up trying to emulate Rorschach's brutal style of justice, he concludes that "Rorschach sucks".
- The Question is featured in Frank Miller's Batman: The Dark Knight Strikes Again as a libertarian, anti-government conspirator. Frank Miller's interpretation of Sage, as a nod to Ditko and Alan Moore, is Randian and preachy, at one point going on television for a series of humorous Crossfire-style exchanges with the Emerald Archer, Green Arrow, who is often portrayed as a liberal progressive. He is also shown as a technophobe, monitoring the dark conspiracy Batman and his allies must face, while writing on an old-fashioned typewriter.
- The Fact: In volume 2, issue #42, during Grant Morrison's run of The Doom Patrol, Flex Mentallo describes a number of his former teammates. Among them was the Fact, whose appearance and name recall those of the Question. He reappears in the Flex Mentallo miniseries.
- Q: Street Fighter III: Third Strike features a playable character dressed in what many assume is an homage to the fabled DC character.

== In other media ==
=== Television ===
- The Question appears in Justice League Unlimited, voiced by Jeffrey Combs. This version is a data broker for the Justice League and a paranoid conspiracy theorist who is distrusted and ridiculed by other League members. He later enters a relationship with ex-Leaguer Huntress while helping her seek revenge on Steven Mandragora in exchange for her help in investigating Project Cadmus.
- The Question appears in Batman: The Brave and the Bold, voiced by Nicholas Guest.
- The Question was intended to appear in an Arrowverse series until Marc Guggenheim revealed in December 2017 that DC Films has plans for the character, preventing The CW from using him.

=== Film ===
- The Question appears in Scooby-Doo! & Batman: The Brave and the Bold, voiced again by Jeffrey Combs. This version is a member of the Mystery Analysts of Gotham, a detectives-only club formed by Batman.
- The Question appears in DC Showcase: Blue Beetle, voiced by David Kaye.
- The Question appears in Justice League: Crisis on Infinite Earths, voiced again by David Kaye. Following the destruction of the multiverse, he refuses to be reborn in the Monoverse, choosing to die rather than live in a "false" universe.

=== Video games ===
- The Question appears as a playable character in Lego Batman 3: Beyond Gotham, voiced by Liam O'Brien.
- The Question appears as a character summon in Scribblenauts Unmasked: A DC Comics Adventure.
- Vic Sage appears in Batman: Arkham Shadow, voiced by David Dastmalchian.

== Collected editions ==
The Steve Ditko series of The Question is featured in a hardback edition:

- Action Heroes Archives, Vol. 2 (DC Archives Edition) by Steve Ditko (author, illustrator); hardcover: 384 pages; publisher: DC Comics, 2007 (ISBN 1401213464)

The Question's 1980s series has been collected into different editions:

- The Question vol. 1: Zen and Violence (collects The Question #1–6, 176 pages, softcover, October 2007, ISBN 1-4012-1579-3)
- The Question vol. 2: Poisoned Ground (collects The Question #7–12, 176 pages, softcover, May 2008, ISBN 1-4012-1693-5)
- The Question vol. 3: Epitaph for a Hero (collects The Question #13–18, 176 pages, softcover, November 2008, ISBN 978-1-4012-1938-3)
- The Question vol. 4: Welcome to Oz (collects The Question #19–24, 176 pages, softcover, April 2009, ISBN 978-1-4012-2094-5)
- The Question vol. 5: Riddles (collects The Question #25–30)
- The Question vol. 6: Peacemaker (collects The Question #31–36, 160 pages, softcover, May 2010)
- The Question by Dennis O'Neil and Denys Cowan Omnibus Vol 1 HC (collects The Question #1-27, Green Arrow Annual #1, The Question Annual #1, Detective Comics Annual #1, 952 pages, hardcover, June 2022, ISBN 9781779515476)
- The Question by Dennis O'Neil and Denys Cowan Omnibus Vol 2 HC (collects The Question #28-36, Azrael Plus #1, Green Arrow Annual #2-3, Question Quarterly #1-5, Showcase '95 #3, The Brave and the Bold #1-6, The Question Annual #2, The Question Returns #1, Who's Who #12, 872 pages, hardcover, November 2023, ISBN 9781779523044)

Collections featuring the Renee Montoya Question:

- The Question: Five Books of Blood (collects Crime Bible: The Five Lessons of Blood (2007–2008) #1–5, 128 pages, hardcover, June 2008, ISBN 1-4012-1799-0)
- The Question: Pipeline (collects Detective Comics #854–863, 128 pages, softcover, February 2011, ISBN 1-4012-3041-5)
