= LG Optimus Vu =

Smartphone model

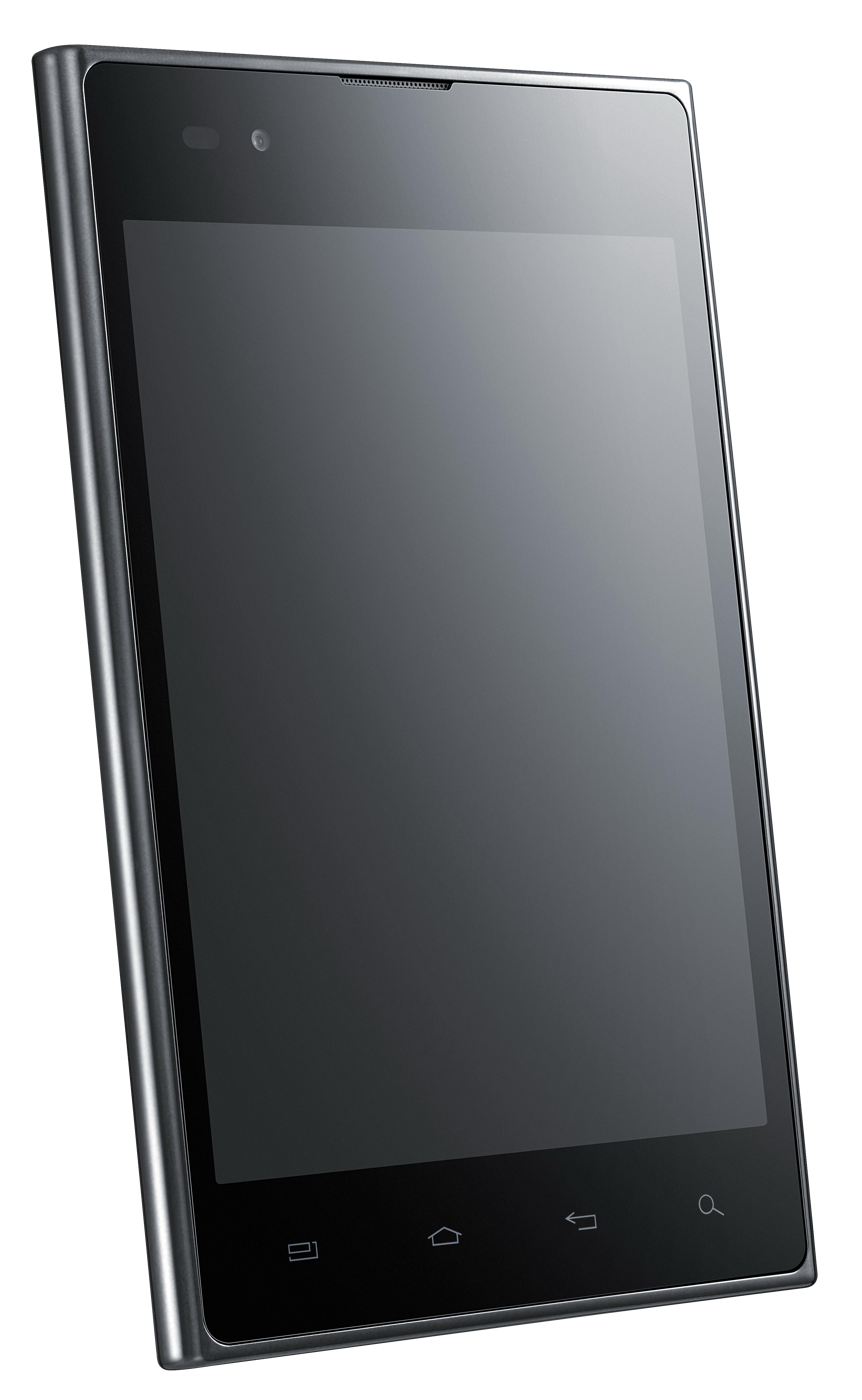
- LG Optimus Vu Front
- Brand: LG
- Manufacturers: LG Electronics, Inc.
- Type: Phablet
- Series: Optimus; Vu
- First released: September 1, 2012
- Successor: LG Optimus Vu II
- Related: LG Optimus 4X HD; LG Optimus 2X; Samsung Galaxy Note
- Compatible networks: GSM/GPRS/EDGE; 850, 900, 1800, 1900 MHz; 3G UMTS/HSPA+ 900, 2100 MHz / 850, 2100 MHz
- Form factor: Slate
- Dimensions: H 139.6 mm W 90.4 mm D 8.5 mm
- Weight: 168 g (6 oz)
- Operating system: Android 4.0.4 "Ice Cream Sandwich"
- CPU: Nvidia Tegra 3 Quad-core 1.5 GHz
- GPU: ULP GeForce
- Memory: 1 GB RAM
- Storage: 32 GB eMMC
- Removable storage: None
- Battery: 2,100 mAh
- Rear camera: 8 MP, 1080p at 30 FPS video
- Front camera: 1.3 MP
- Display: 5.0-inch (768×1024) IPS LCD (256 ppi)
- Connectivity: Wi-Fi 802.11 b/g/n, Wi-Fi Hotspot, DLNA, Bluetooth 4.0 + A2DP; NFC
- Data inputs: Touch
- SAR: Head: 0.418 W/kg 1 g Body: 1.19 W/kg 1 g Hotspot: 1.19 W/kg 1 g

The LG Optimus Vu (Also known as LG Intuition on Verizon) is an Android phablet smartphone released in August 2012 and noted for its 4:3 aspect ratio 5.0-inch screen size—between that of conventional smartphones, and larger tablets. It is powered by a 1.5 GHz quad-core Nvidia Tegra 3 CPU with Nvidia ULP GeForce GPU. The Korean version of the phone, known as LG Optimus Vu F100S was released in March, 2012, with a dual-core 1.5 GHz Qualcomm MSM 8660 Snapdragon CPU and Adreno 220 GPU, and with Android 2.3.5 Gingerbread. The Korean model has since received updates to Android 4.0.4 Ice Cream Sandwich and Android 4.1.2 Jelly Bean.

== See also ==
- LG Optimus
- LG Intuition
- List of LG mobile phones
