= LG Vu series =

Series of stylus enabled LG Android devices

The LG Vu series is a line of high-end stylus enabled Android devices produced by LG Electronics. The "Vu" designation was first introduced in 2008 as a branch of the LG Optimus series for flagship stylus enabled devices, but after the unveiling of the LG Vu 3 in September 2013 (which did not carry the Optimus branding), LG officially introduced the Vu series as a distinct brand separate from Optimus.

== Smartphones ==
- LG Optimus Vu
- LG Optimus Vu II
- LG Vu 3
