= Hubby =

Hubby may refer to:

== Slang ==
- Hubcap
- Husband

== People ==
- Harry P. Gamble (1904–1995), American multi-sport college athlete nicknamed "Hubby"
- Hubby Jenkins, American musician
- J. L. Hubby (1932–1996), American geneticist and pioneer of gel electrophoresis
- Chubby Hubby, blogger Aun Koh (born 1972) from Singapore

== See also ==
- Huby (disambiguation)
- "Hubbie", nickname of Husband E. Kimmel (1882–1968), US Navy admiral and commander-in-chief of the United States Pacific Fleet during the Japanese attack on Pearl Harbor
- "Hubbie", nickname of Archie Turner (musician) (born 1946), American keyboard player and songwriter
