= Huby =

Huby may refer to:

- Huby (surname)
- Huby, Hambleton
- Huby, Harrogate
- Huby, Kuyavian-Pomeranian Voivodeship (north-central Poland)
- Huby, Łódź Voivodeship (central Poland)
- Huby, Silesian Voivodeship (south Poland)
- Huby, part of the Nowe Miasto district of Poznań (west Poland)
- Huby, district in Wrocław (south-west Poland)

== See also ==
- Huby-Saint-Leu, a commune in France
