= The Hub =

The Hub may refer to:

== Places ==
- The Hub, Bronx, an area of the South Bronx, New York, known for its convergence of subway and bus lines
- The Hub (Edinburgh), former church in Edinburgh that is now home to the Edinburgh International Festival
- The Hub (Gainesville, Florida), historic building on University of Florida campus
- The Hub, Jersey City a neighborhood in Jersey City, New Jersey
- The Hub (Los Angeles), a large clothing store in Los Angeles 1896–1922
- The Hub (New Brunswick, New Jersey), medical and educational research building
- The Hub, Newcastle, a development in Newcastle Haymarket in England
- The Hub (Verwood), an entertainment venue in Verwood, Dorset, England
- The Hub Karen, a shopping mall at the outskirts of Karen, Nairobi
- The Hub, the original name of the Henry C. Lytton & Co. department store
- Boston, Massachusetts, by nickname
- The Hub (building), a residential skyscraper in Brooklyn, New York
- Husky Union Building, University of Washington, informally called "the Hub"

== Fiction ==
- "The Hub" (Agents of S.H.I.E.L.D.), an episode from the science-fiction series Agents of S.H.I.E.L.D.
- "The Hub" (Battlestar Galactica), an episode from the science-fiction series Battlestar Galactica
- The Hub (Discworld), the centre of the Discworld in the Discworld series by Terry Pratchett
- The Hub (Fallout), land area in Fallout (video game)
- The Hub, headquarters of Torchwood Institute in the Torchwood television series
- The Hub, name of the fictional cafe from That '70s Show
- The Hub, setting for several short stories and novels by science fiction writer James H. Schmitz

== Media ==
- The Hub, the former name for Discovery Family, an American cable television channel
- The Hub (band), a computer network music ensemble
- The Hub (TV programme), a British news program

== Other uses ==
- The Hub (forum), a darknet market discussion forum

== See also ==
- Hub (disambiguation)
