= Hub Building =

- U.S. National Register of Historic Places
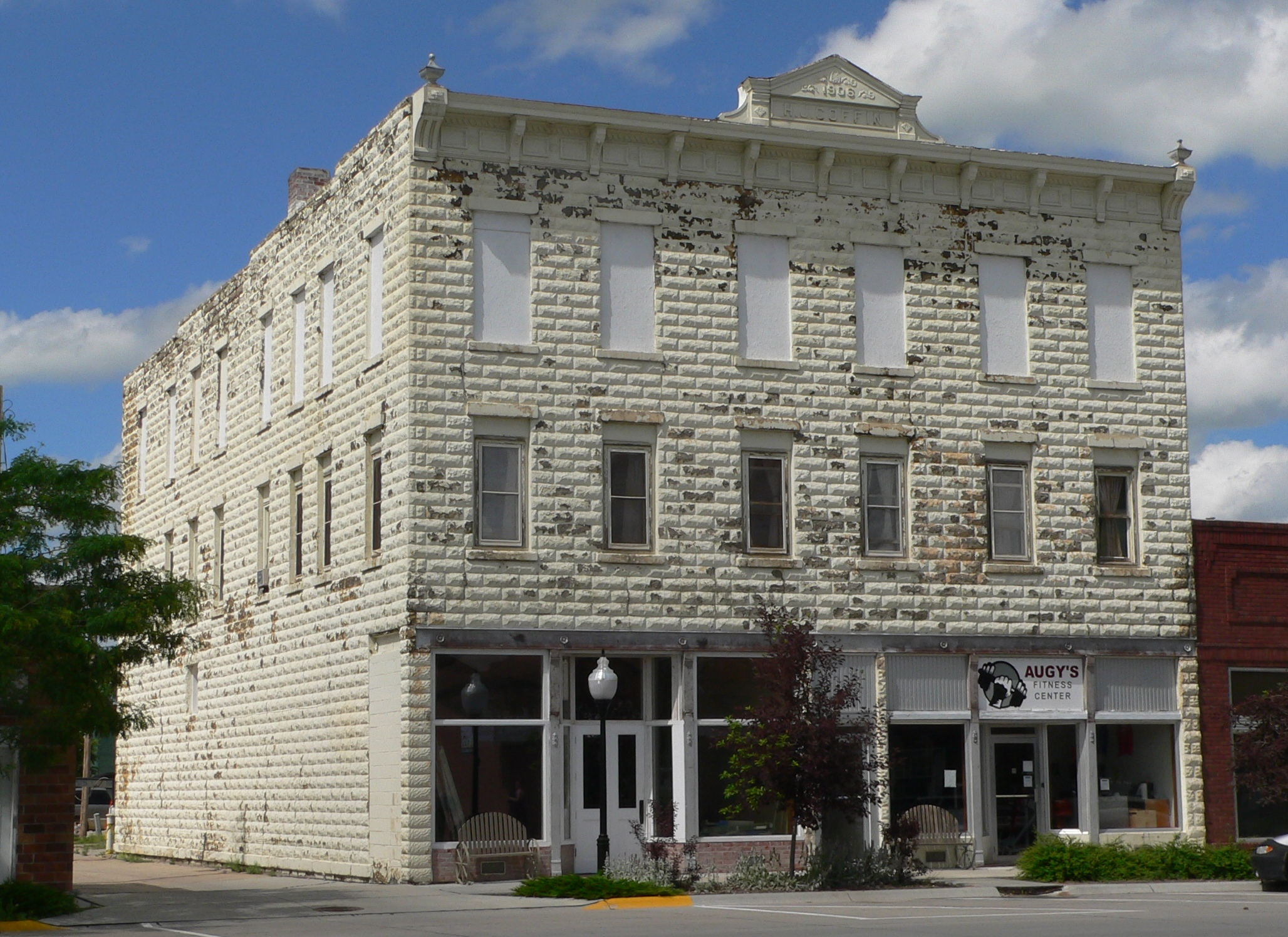

- Location within Nebraska Location within the United States
- Location: 180 Grand Ave., Burwell, Nebraska
- Coordinates: 41.781829°N 99.135246°W
- Area: less than one acre
- Built: 1906
- Architectural style: Italianate
- NRHP reference No.: 06000558
- Added to NRHP: July 12, 2006

The Hub Building in Burwell, Nebraska, also known as the Burwell's Modern Cash Department Store, was built in 1906. It was listed on the National Register of Historic Places in 2006.

It is a three-story building about 50 by 80 feet (15 m × 24 m) in plan with a full basement. Its walls are built of rusticated concrete which appears to be stone. It has a tin Italianate-style cornice and has a parapet inscribed with "1906 / H.J. Coffin".

Space in the Hub Building was donated for temporary use by the community's library, supporting the community's efforts to obtain funding and construct the Burwell Carnegie Library, completed in 1914.

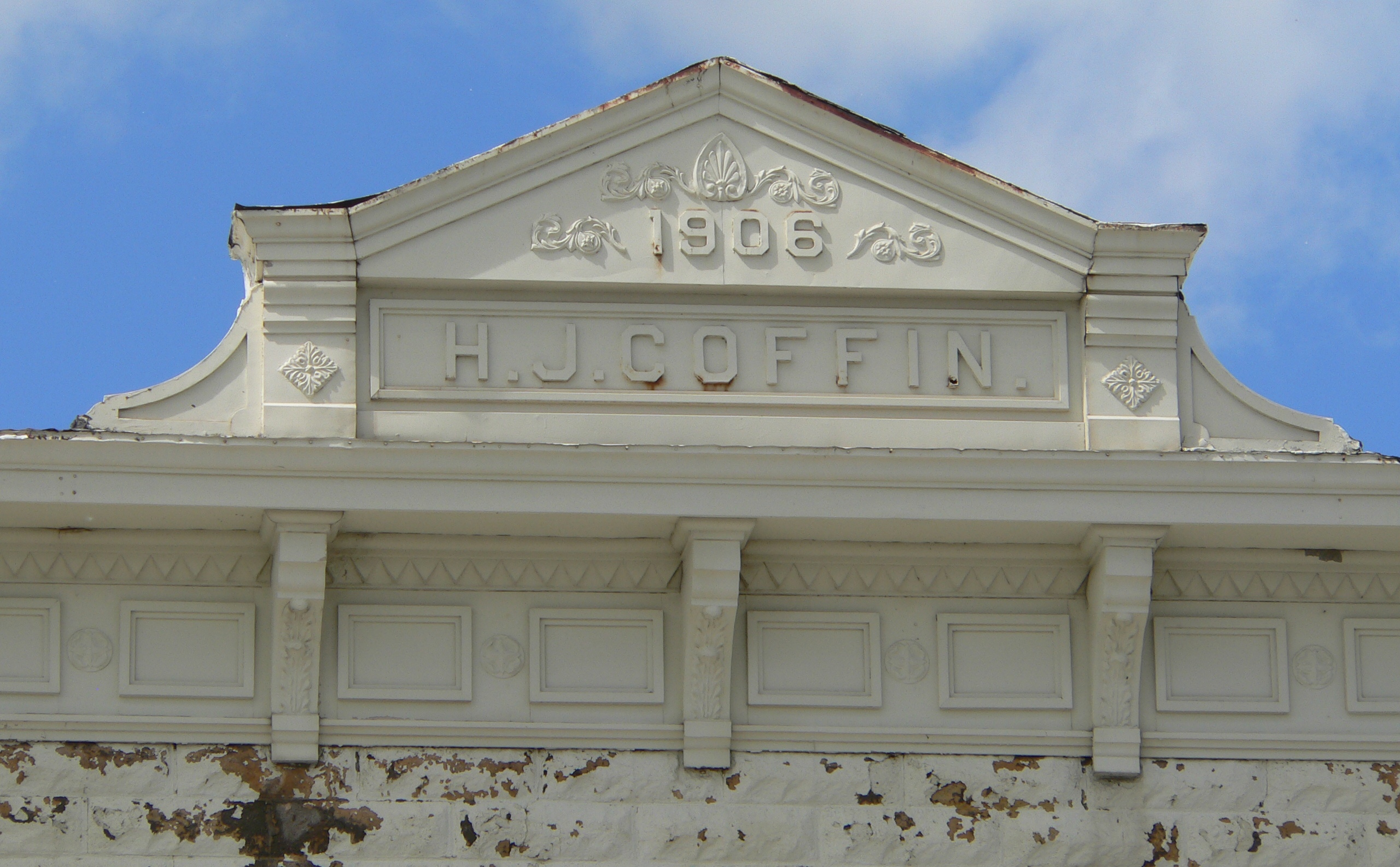
Crest of building
