= Asus ZenFone 5 (2018) =

ASUS smartphone

Asus Zenfone otin Asus Zenfone 5Z

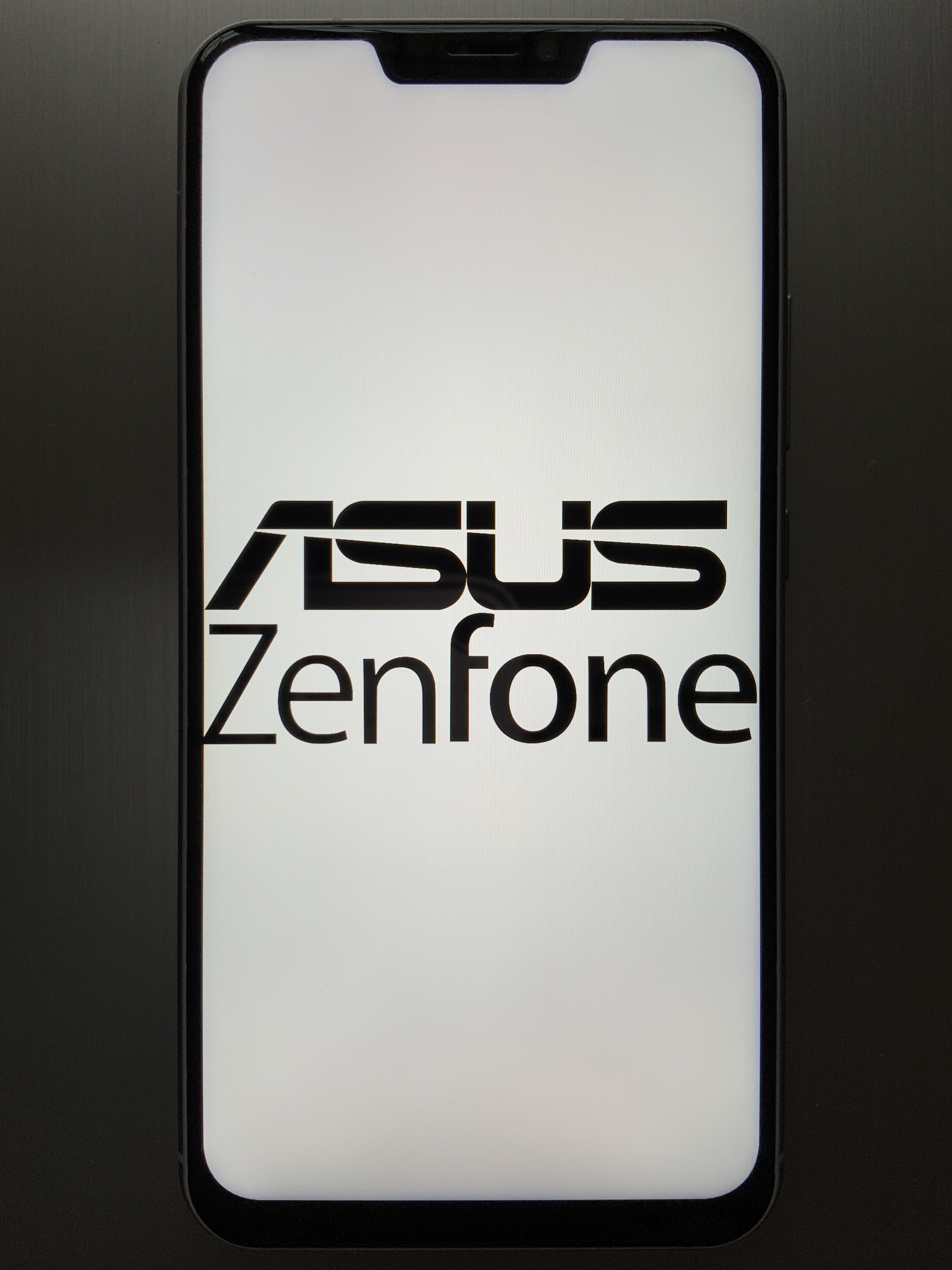
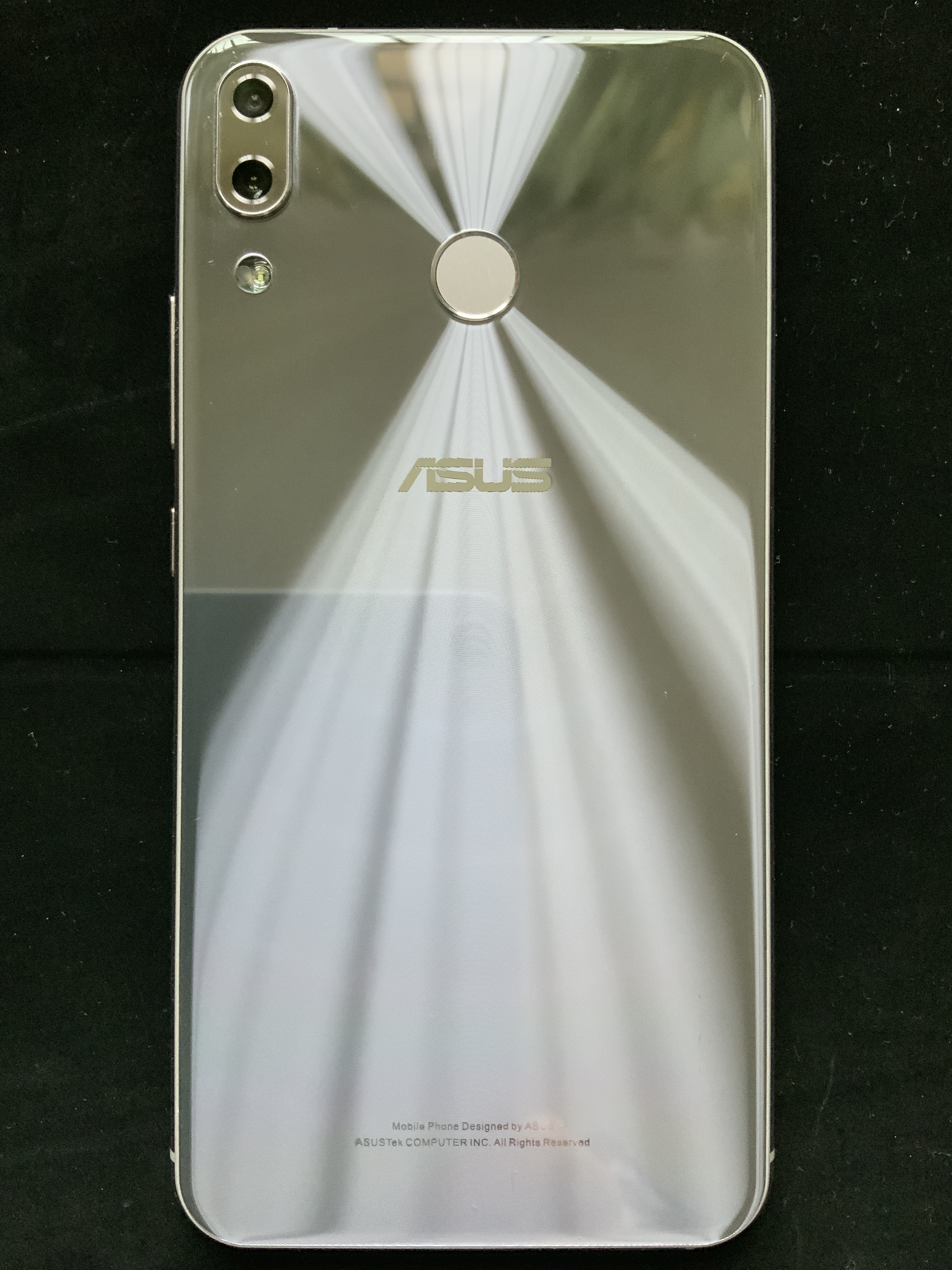
- Zenfone 5 (2018)
- Brand: Asus
- Manufacturer: Asus
- Type: Phablet
- Series: Asus Zenfone
- First released: August 6, 2018; 7 years ago
- Predecessor: Asus ZenFone 4 (2017); Asus ZenFone 4 Pro
- Successor: Asus ZenFone 6/6Z
- Related: Asus ZenFone 5 Lite
- Compatible networks: 2G, 3G, and 4G
- Form factor: Slate
- Dimensions: 153 mm (6.0 in) H 75.7 mm (2.98 in) W 5: 7.7 mm (0.30 in) D 5Z: 7.9 mm (0.31 in) D
- Weight: 165 g (5.8 oz)
- Operating system: Android 8.1 (Oreo) with Asus ZenUI 5.0
- System-on-chip: Snapdragon 636
- CPU: 5: Octa-core (4x1.8 GHz + 4x1.6 GHz) Kryo; 5Z: Octa-core (4×2.7 GHz + 4×1.7 GHz) Kryo
- GPU: 5: Adreno 509; 5Z: Adreno 630
- Memory: 5: 4 or 6 GB LPDDR4 RAM; 5Z: 4, 6 or 8 GB RAM
- Storage: 5: 64 GB eMCP; 5Z: 64, 128, or 256 GB UFS 2.1
- Battery: 3,300 mAh Li-Ion
- Charging: 5: 10W; 5Z: 18W fast charging
- Rear camera: 1080p Dual 12 MP + 8 MP, Asus TriTech autofocus, 2160p, 4K UHD 3840×2160 video
- Front camera: 8 MP
- Display: 6.2 inches, Full HD+ (2246×1080 pixel), IPS Corning Gorilla Glass
- Connectivity: Bluetooth 5.0, GPS, GLONASS, BeiDou and Galileo, USB-C, FM radio
- Data inputs: Fingerprint scanner (rear-mounted), Accelerometer, gyroscope, proximity sensor, Ambient light sensor (ZenFone 5); electronic compass
- Model: 5: ZE620KL; 5Z: ZS620KL
- Website: www.asus.com/Phone/ZenFone-5-ZE620KL/Tech-Specs/ www.asus.com/us/Phone/ZenFone-5Z-ZS620KL/

Asus Zenfone 5 is a line of Android smartphones made by Asus. It is part of the Asus Zenfone series. The ZenFone 5 was unveiled on 27 February 2018 at the Mobile World Congress and went on sale on 6 August 2018, while the higher-end ZenFone 5Z was unveiled on 16 May 2018, and went on retail sale on 6 August 2018. The smartphone line also includes the lower-end ZenFone 5 Lite.

== Variants ==
Model	Processor	Processor Architecture	RAM	GPU	Display	Camera	Internal storage	Battery	Platform
Asus Zenfone 5Z (ZS620KL)	Qualcomm Snapdragon MSM8998 845 (4x2.7 GHz Kryo 385 Gold & 4x1.7 GHz Kryo 385 Silver octa-core)	ARM	4/6/8 GB LPDDR4 RAM	Adreno 630	6.2 inches, Full HD 2246×1080, IPS Corning Gorilla Glass	8 MP front, 1080p Dual 12 MP + 8 MP rear, Asus TriTech autofocus, 2160p, 4K UHD 3840×2160 video	64/128/256 GB UFS 2.1 Storage	3,300 mAh	Android Oreo 8.0; upgradable to Android 10
Asus Zenfone 5 (ZE620KL)	Qualcomm Snapdragon SDM636 (4x1.8 GHz Kryo 260 Gold + 4x1.6 GHz Kryo 260 Silver octa-core)	ARM	4/6 GB LPDDR4 RAM	Adreno 509	6.2 inches, Full HD 2246×1080, IPS Corning Gorilla Glass	8 MP front, 1080p Dual 12 MP + 8 MP rear, Asus TriTech autofocus, 2160p, 4K UHD 3840×2160 video	64 GB eMCP storage	3,300 mAh	Android Oreo 8.0; upgradable to Android Pie 9.0
Asus Zenfone 5 Lite / 5Q (ZC600KL)	Qualcomm Snapdragon SDM630 (2.2 GHz Cortex-A53 octa-core); Qualcomm MSM8937 430 (4x1.4 GHz Cortex-A53 + 4x1.1 GHz Cortex A53 octa-core)	ARM	3 GB/4 GB LPDDR3 RAM	Adreno 508; Adreno 505	6.0 inches, Full HD 2160×1080, IPS Corning Gorilla Glass	Dual 20 MP front, 1080p Dual 16 MP rear, Asus TriTech autofocus, 2160p, 4K UHD 3840×2160 video	32 GB/64 GB eMCP storage	3,300 mAh	Android Nougat 7.1.1; upgradable to Android Pie 9.0

Preceded by ZenFone 4	ZenFone 5Q; ZenFone 5 ZenFone 5Z; 5th generation	Succeeded by ZenFone 6
