= Hub Wagner =

American football and basketball coach

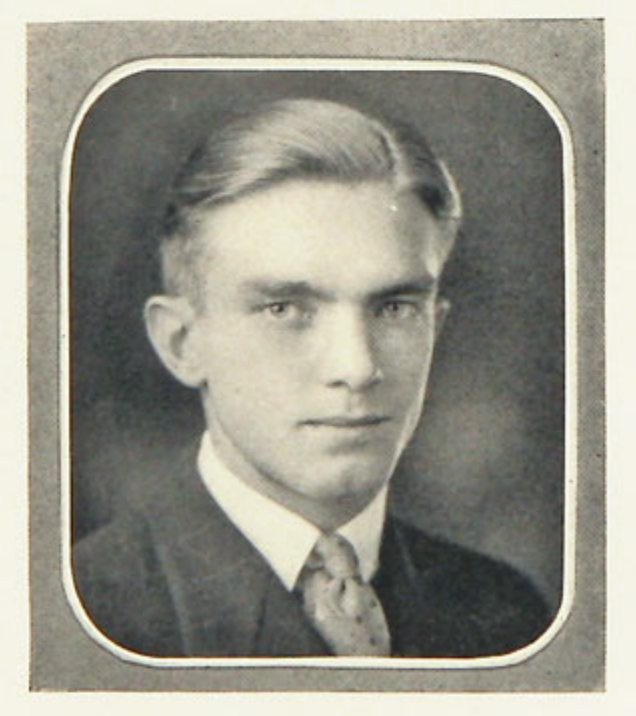

Biographical details
- Born: September 20, 1904; Davenport, Iowa, U.S.
- Died: August 15, 1992 (aged 87); Rock Island, Illinois, U.S.

Coaching career (HC unless noted)

Football
- 1936–1942: Carthage

Basketball
- 1927–1943: Carthage

Head coaching record
- Overall: 20–29–6 (football); 170–107 (basketball)

Herbert Louis "Hub" Wagner (September 20, 1904 – August 15, 1992) was an American football and basketball coach. He served as the head football coach at Carthage College in Carthage, Illinois for seven seasons, from 1936 to 1942, compiling a record of 20–29–6. Wagner was also the head basketball coach at Carthage from 1927 to 1943, tallying a mark of 170–107.

== Head coaching record ==
=== Football ===
Year	Team	Overall	Conference	Standing	Bowl/playoffs
Carthage Red Men (Illinois Intercollegiate Athletic Conference) (1936–1940)
1936	Carthage	2–5–1	1–4–1	19th	
1937	Carthage	1–6	1–5	19th	
1938	Carthage	6–1–1	3–0	2nd	
1939	Carthage	2–6–1	2–1	4th	
1940	Carthage	5–2–1	2–0	2nd	
Carthage Red Men (Independent) (1941–1942)
1941	Carthage	1–5–2			
1942	Carthage	3–4			
Carthage:		20–29–6	9–10–1		
Total:		20–29–6			
