= Hub (Minneapolis, Minnesota) =

Apartment building in Minneapolis, Minnesota

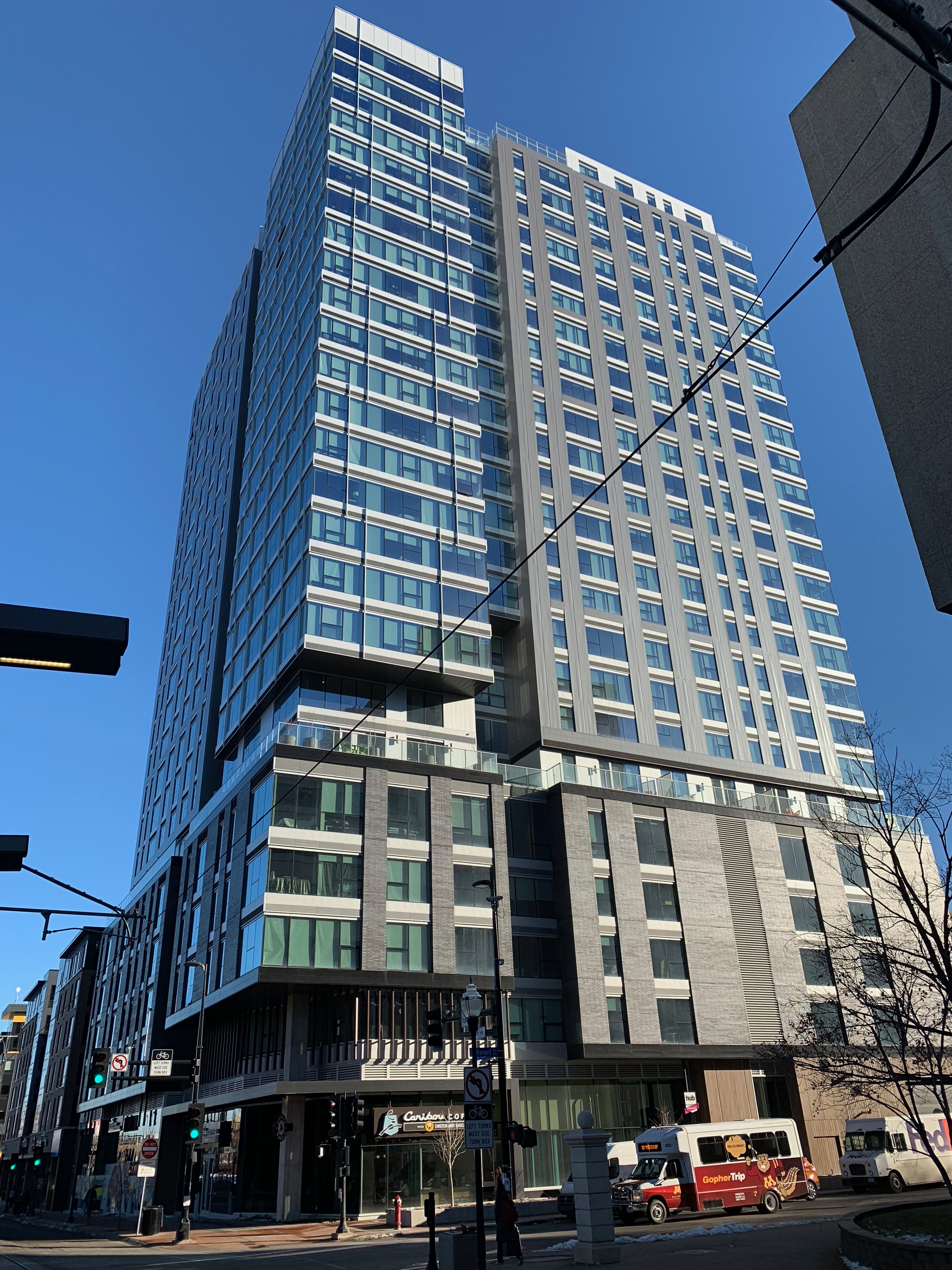
- The front exterior of the Hub in 2018
- Interactive map of the Hub area
- Alternative names: Hub Minneapolis; Hub on Campus

General information
- Type: Residential; mixed-use
- Location: Minneapolis, Minnesota, 311 Harvard Street Southeast
- Coordinates: 44°58′23″N 93°13′21″W
- Construction started: October 2016
- Completed: August 2018
- Cost: $100 million (USD)
- Owner: Core Spaces; Harbor Bay Real Estate
- Landlord: Greystar

Height
- Height: 284 ft (87 m)

Technical details
- Floor count: 26
- Floor area: 443,904 sq ft (41,240.0 m^{2})

Design and construction
- Architecture firm: Hartshorne Plunkard Architecture
- Structural engineer: Meyer Borgman Johnson
- Civil engineer: Kimley-Horn
- Main contractor: J.H. Findorff & Son

The Hub (also referred to as Hub Minneapolis and Hub on Campus) is a luxury residential apartment building located in Minneapolis, Minnesota. The building features two hot tubs and a pool. The project was first announced under the working name 311 Harvard, before being renamed as the Hub during construction. The building was designed by Hartshorne Plunkard Architecture and includes 407 residential units designated for the campus population of the nearby University of Minnesota. It also contains leasable retail space, with current tenants including Caribou Coffee, Chase Bank, Wells Fargo, and Roti Modern Mediterranean.

== Construction and opening ==
Construction began on the Hub in October 2016 with a traditional groundbreaking ceremony. In the official proposal for the Hub, the completed project would become one of the tallest structures located near the University of Minnesota campus.

== Design ==
The exterior contains a 268 ft (82 m) glass curtain wall, inspired by neighboring urban walls within the vicinity. Holly Dolezalek from Minneapolis financial magazine Finance & Commerce named it one of the "Top Projects of 2018", highlighting its efforts to continue construction despite numerous setbacks.

== Location ==
The Hub is located at the intersection of Harvard Street Southeast and Washington Avenue Southeast, adjacent to the Metro Green Line East Bank light rail station. It was built atop a former retail block in the East Bank neighborhood of Minneapolis, with previous businesses such as Big 10 Restaurant and Espresso Exposé becoming displaced after the project's announcement.
