= Huby (surname) =

Huby is an Indonesian and French surname. Notable people with the name include:

- Anne-Marie Huby (1966), Belgian businesswoman
- Craig Huby (1986), English rugby league footballer
- Pamela Huby (1922–2019), British philosopher
