= Hub Nelson =

American ice hockey player

Hubert Milton J. Nelson (August 14, 1907 – May 10, 1981) was a professional ice hockey player. Born in Minneapolis, Minnesota, Nelson played professionally in United States Hockey League for the Minneapolis Millers (AHA) and St. Louis Flyers. He was inducted into the United States Hockey Hall of Fame in 1978.
