= Burwell Carnegie Library =

- U.S. National Register of Historic Places
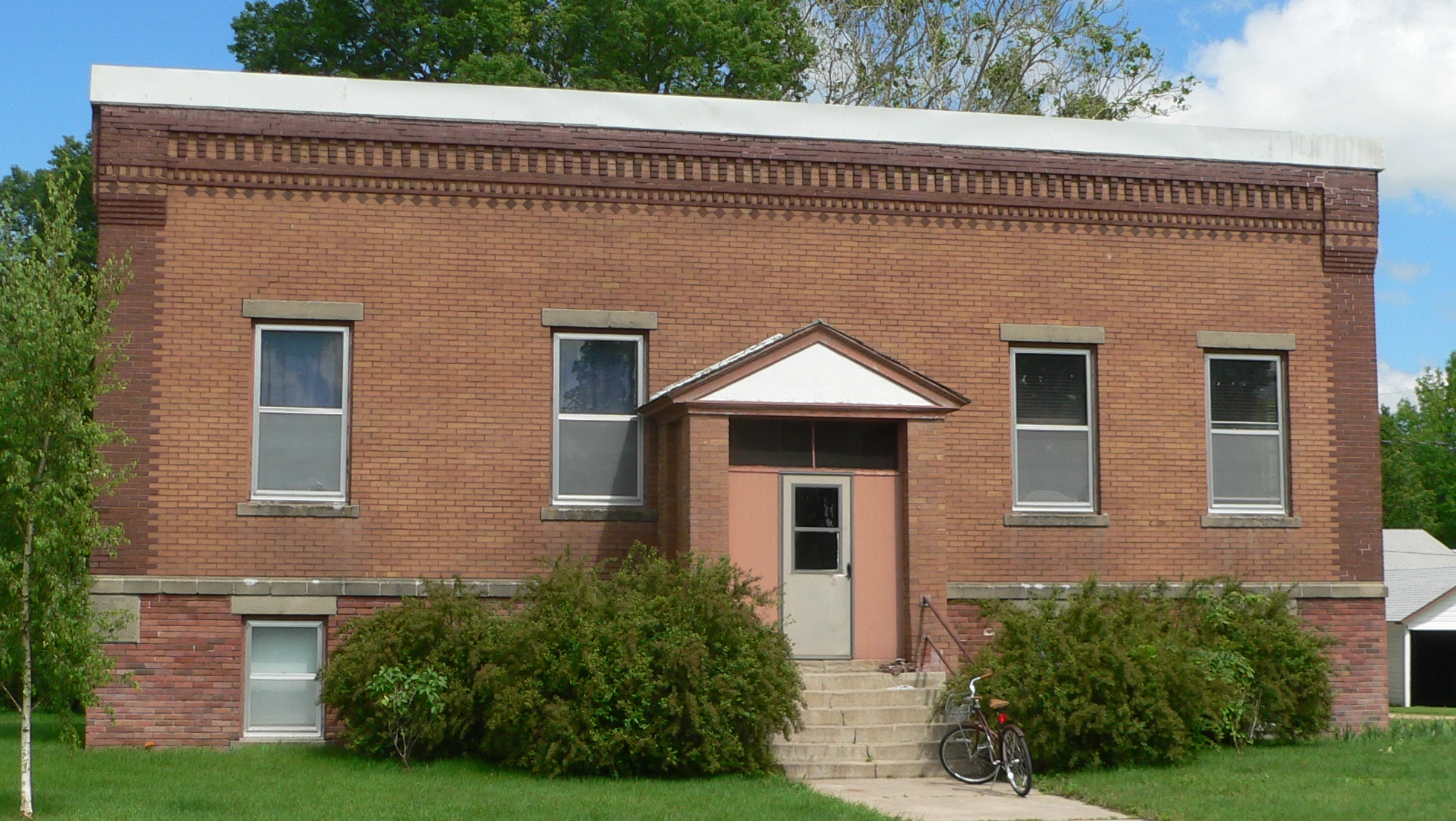

- Location within Nebraska Location within the United States
- Location: 110 S. 7th Ave., Burwell, Nebraska
- Coordinates: 41.781944°N 99.132778°W
- Area: less than one acre
- Built by: T.J. Pryor
- MPS: Carnegie Libraries in Nebraska MPS
- NRHP reference No.: 06000557
- Added to NRHP: July 11, 2006

The Garfield County Library, also known as the Burwell Carnegie Library, is a historic Carnegie library in Burwell, Nebraska. It was listed on the National Register of Historic Places in 2006.

A library for the community of Burwell was a goal of the Burwell Woman's Literary Club, which was organized with 11 charter members in 1907. Correspondence with Andrew Carnegie and/or the Carnegie Foundation began by 1911; a condition was set that Burwell must create a tax for maintenance of the library, and the Village Board passed such an ordinance in January 1912. The project was supported enthsiasticly by the Burwell Tribune. After delay from lost correspondence or miscommunication, the library plans were approved and a $5,000 grant for construction was authorized.

The building is a one-story brick building with a raised basement, designed simply in accordance with preferences of James Bertram, Carnegie's secretary, who set design standards for the grant program after earlier projects seemed to waste funds on ornamentation. Decoration is achieved by use of cherry red brick being used for corbelling and pseudo-cornices and pseudo-pilasters, contrasting with yellow buff brick which is the main element. It is about 50 by 27 feet (15.2 m × 8.2 m) in plan and has 22 windows. The building was built by contractor T.J. Pryor in 1914.
