= Verizon Hub =

Mobile phone sold by Verizon Wireless

- Verizon Hub showing navigation screen and major applications
- Manufacturer: Verizon
- Type: media phone
- Availability by region: February 1st, 2009
- Discontinued: September 29th, 2009
- Compatible networks: VoIP
- Dimensions: 9" x 12" x 0.5"
- Weight: 1.5 lbs.
- CPU: 500 MHz FreeScale iMX.31 & BlackFin BF537 DSP
- Memory: 128MB RAM
- Storage: 64GB NAND flash (formatted with YAFFS2)
- Display: 7" WVGA LCD screen (800 x 480 pixels) at 16-bit color with alpha blending.
- Connectivity: (1) 10 / 100 Ethernet Port; (1) 802.11b / g wireless client interface; 802.1x connectivity support for WEP, WPA, WPA2 and QoS; DECT 6.0

The Verizon Hub was a media phone available from Verizon Wireless. It featured a seven-inch LCD screen with 16-bit color. The hub was able to sync the user's calendar, contact details, maps, traffic, and weather reports. The Verizon Hub did not require the owner to have Verizon Fios, and connected to a wireless network. It featured a wireless handset and speakerphone. The hub also allowed users to send text and photo messages, but only to other Verizon Wireless phones. Because the device utilized voice over internet protocol (VoIP) technology, users were able set the hub to forward calls to another phone number in the event of a power or internet outage.

The hardware and the custom Linux distribution was provided by Open Peak Inc. Most application development work was done in Verizon's India-based office VDSI in Hyderabad. The device also required users to watch video advertisements before utilizing features such as the traffic application, despite a monthly subscription fee of $35.

== Features ==
Some of the features of the Verizon Hub were:

- Anonymous Call Blocking
- Call Logs
- Scheduled Call Forwarding
- Speed Dialing
- Unlimited Nationwide Calling (US & Canada)
