= Hub City =

Hub City or Hub city may refer to:

== Travel ==
- A city used as an airline hub
- Term used to refer to the sites of a bio-secure bubble

== Places ==
Pakistan

- Hub, Pakistan

United States

- Hub City, Wisconsin

== Comics ==
- Hub City (comics), a fictional city from the DC Comics Universe

== Nicknames ==
Canada

- Nanaimo, British Columbia
- Moncton, New Brunswick
- Saskatoon, Saskatchewan

United States

- Phenix City, Alabama
- Compton, California
- Limon, Colorado
- Miami, Florida
- Crestview, Florida
- Rochelle, Illinois
- Union City, Indiana
- Oelwein, Iowa
- Elizabethtown, Kentucky
- Lafayette, Louisiana
- Hagerstown, Maryland
- Boston, Massachusetts
- Jordan, Minnesota
- Hattiesburg, Mississippi
- New Brunswick, New Jersey
- Belen, New Mexico
- Spartanburg, South Carolina
- Aberdeen, South Dakota
- Jackson, Tennessee
- Alice, Texas
- Lubbock, Texas
- Pharr, Texas
- Mount Pleasant, Utah
- Burlington, Washington
- Marshfield, Wisconsin
