= Phablet =

Obsolete term for a smartphone with larger screen sizes

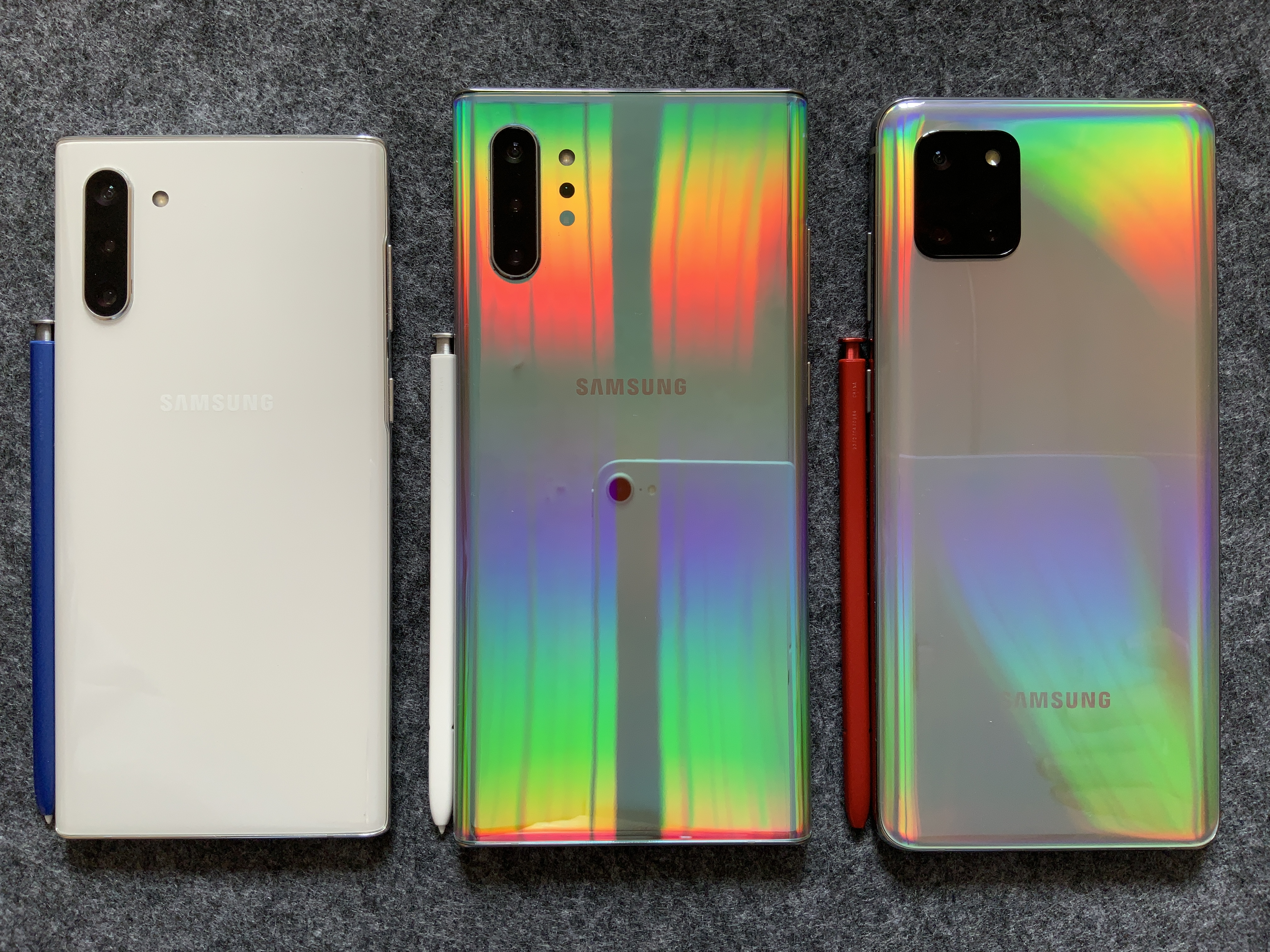
Backs of Samsung Galaxy Note 10, Samsung Galaxy Note 10+ and Samsung Galaxy Note 10 Lite, which are considered phablets (from left to right)

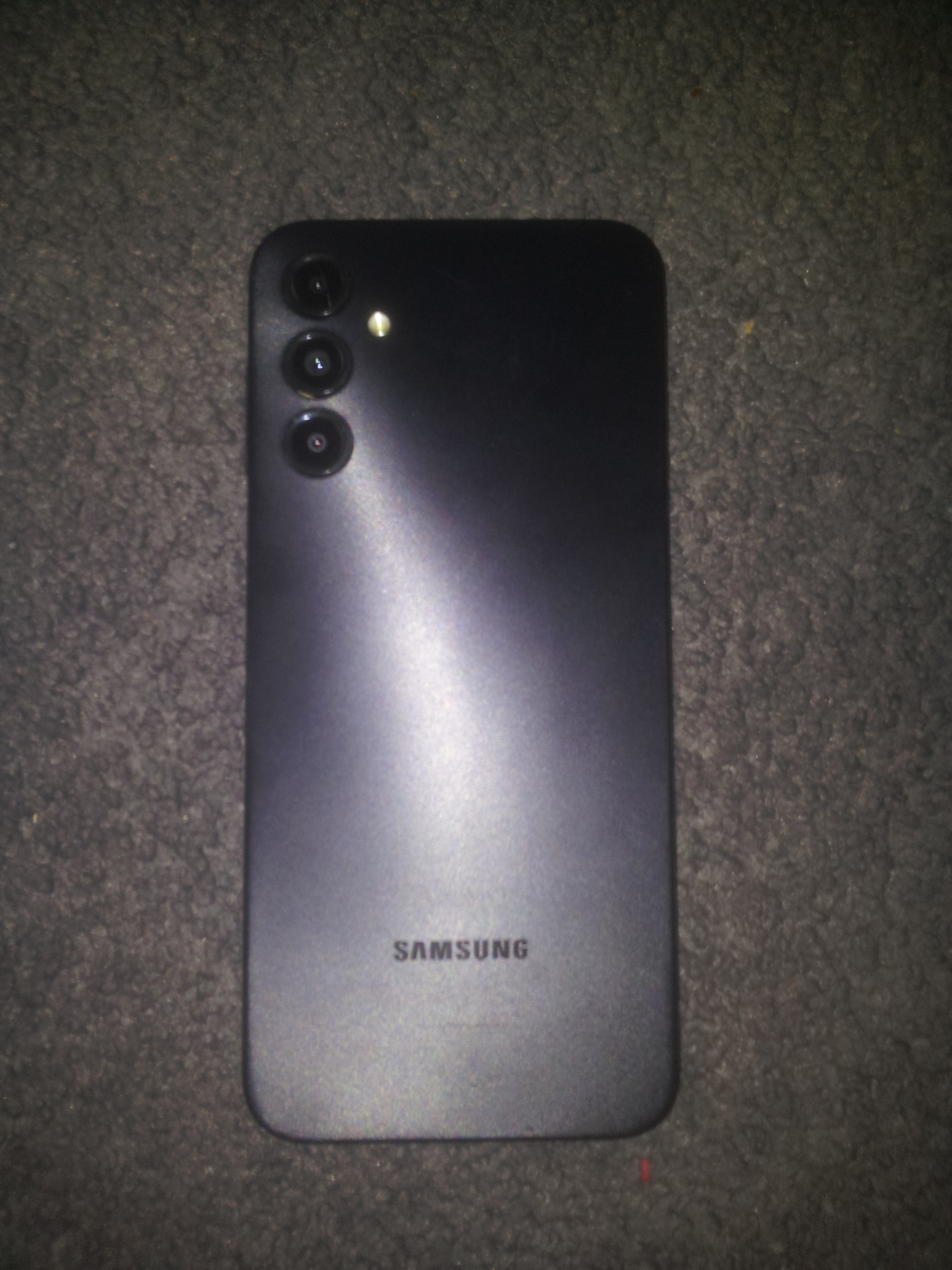
Back of a Samsung Galaxy A14, an entry-level smartphone with a phablet size

Phablet (/ˈfæblət/, /-lɪt/) is a term that arose in the early 2010s to describe mobile devices combining or straddling the size formats of smartphones and tablets. The word is a blend word or portmanteau of phone and tablet. They feature large displays for screen-intensive activity and may include a stylus. The form factor did not become popular until the arrival of the Galaxy Note in the 2010s. PC Magazine called the 1993 AT&T EO 440 "the first true phablet".

By the late 2010s, the term had largely fallen into disuse, especially as phone sizes grew, in some cases to the size of a small tablet, up to 180 mm (7.1 in), with wider aspect ratios.

== Appearance ==
Phablets feature large displays that complement screen-intensive activity such as web browsing, mobile gaming, and multimedia viewing. They may also include software optimized for an integral self-storing stylus to facilitate sketching, note-taking, drawing and annotation. Phablets were originally designed for the Asian market where consumers could not afford both a smartphone and tablet as in North America; phones for that market are known for having "budget-specs-big-battery" with large low resolution screens and midrange processors, although other phablets have flagship specifications.

Since then, phablets in North America have also become successful for several reasons, most notably: Android Ice Cream Sandwich and subsequent releases of Android were suited to large as well as small screen sizes, while older consumers preferred larger screen sizes on phones due to deteriorating eyesight. Examples of earlier devices with similar form factors date to 1993. The term "phablet" was widespread in the industry from 2012 to 2014 although its usage has declined since average phone sizes eventually morphed into small tablet sizes, up to 6.9 inches.

== Definition ==
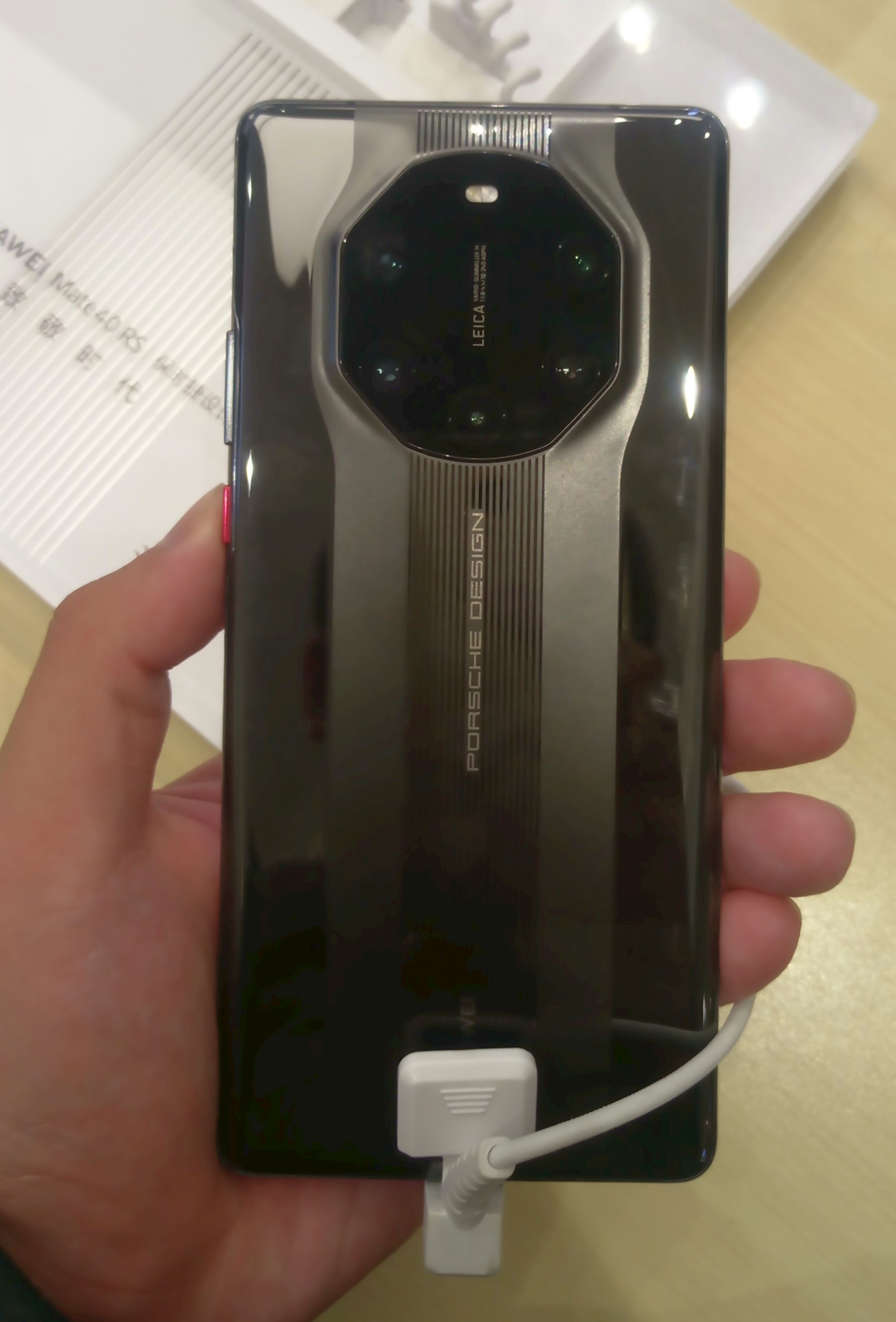
The Huawei Mate series

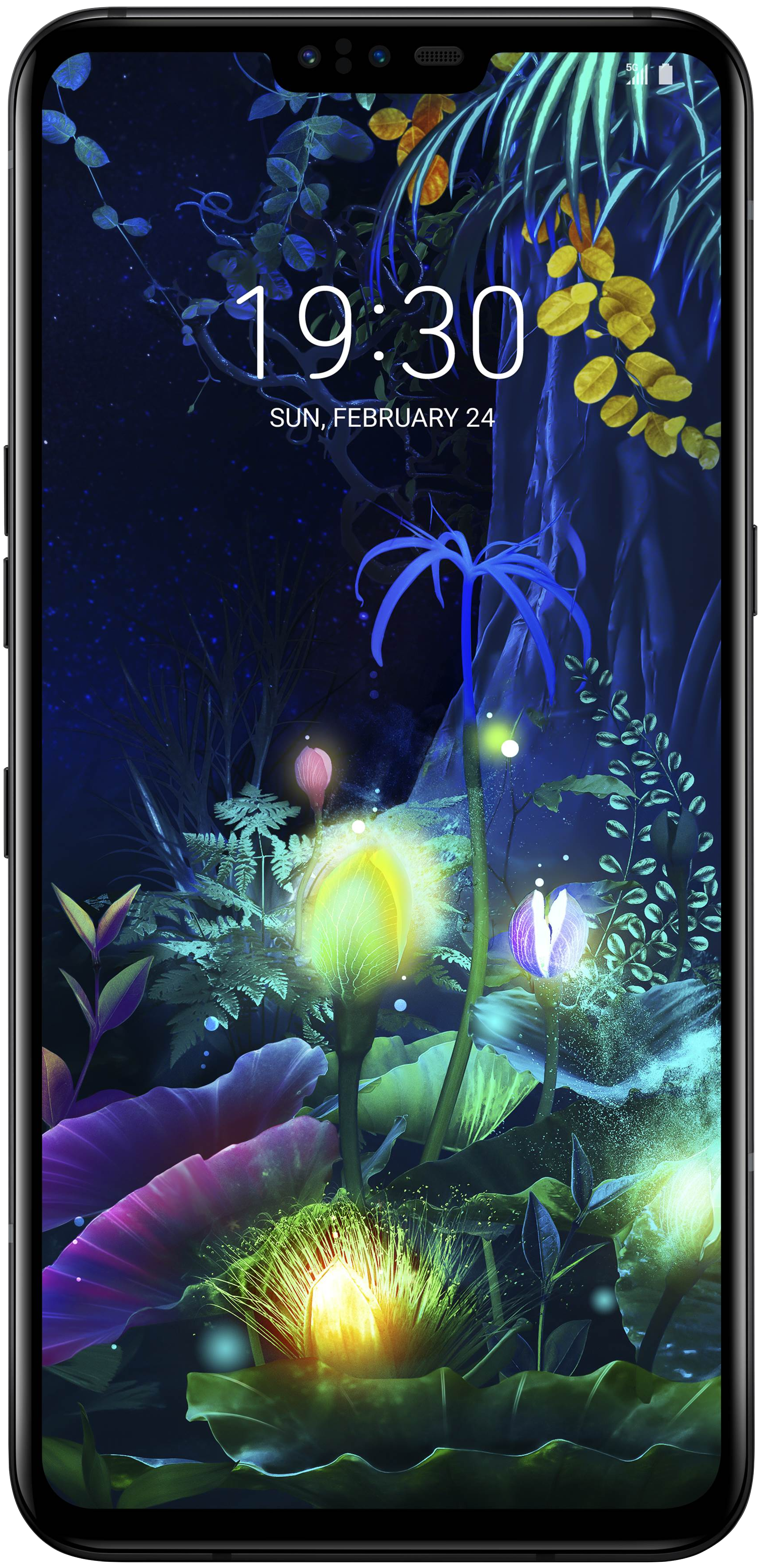
The discontinued LG V series

Since its inception, the definition of a phablet has evolved as displays have grown larger – on mainstream phones, and phones designed with thin bezels or curved screens to make them more compact than other devices with similar screen sizes. Thus, a device with a "phablet-sized" screen may not necessarily be considered one.

Phablets typically have a diagonal display measurement between 4.6 in (120 mm) and 5.5 in (140 mm). In comparison, most flagship phones released in 2022 had a screen size of 6.1 in (150 mm) and over, with larger versions of mainstream flagships (such as iPhone 14 Pro Max, Pixel 7 Pro, and Galaxy S23 Ultra) using 6.7 in (170 mm) and over displays. PhoneArena argued that the Galaxy S7 Edge was not a phablet, as it has a narrow and compact build with a physical footprint more in line with the smaller-screened Nexus 5X, due primarily to its use of a display with curved edges.

In the early 2010s, several manufacturers released phones with displays taller than the conventional 3:2 aspect ratio used by the majority of devices, and diagonal screen sizes often around 4 inches. However, in these cases, the sizes of the devices are more compact than the 3:2 aspect ratio devices with equivalent diagonal screen sizes.

== History ==
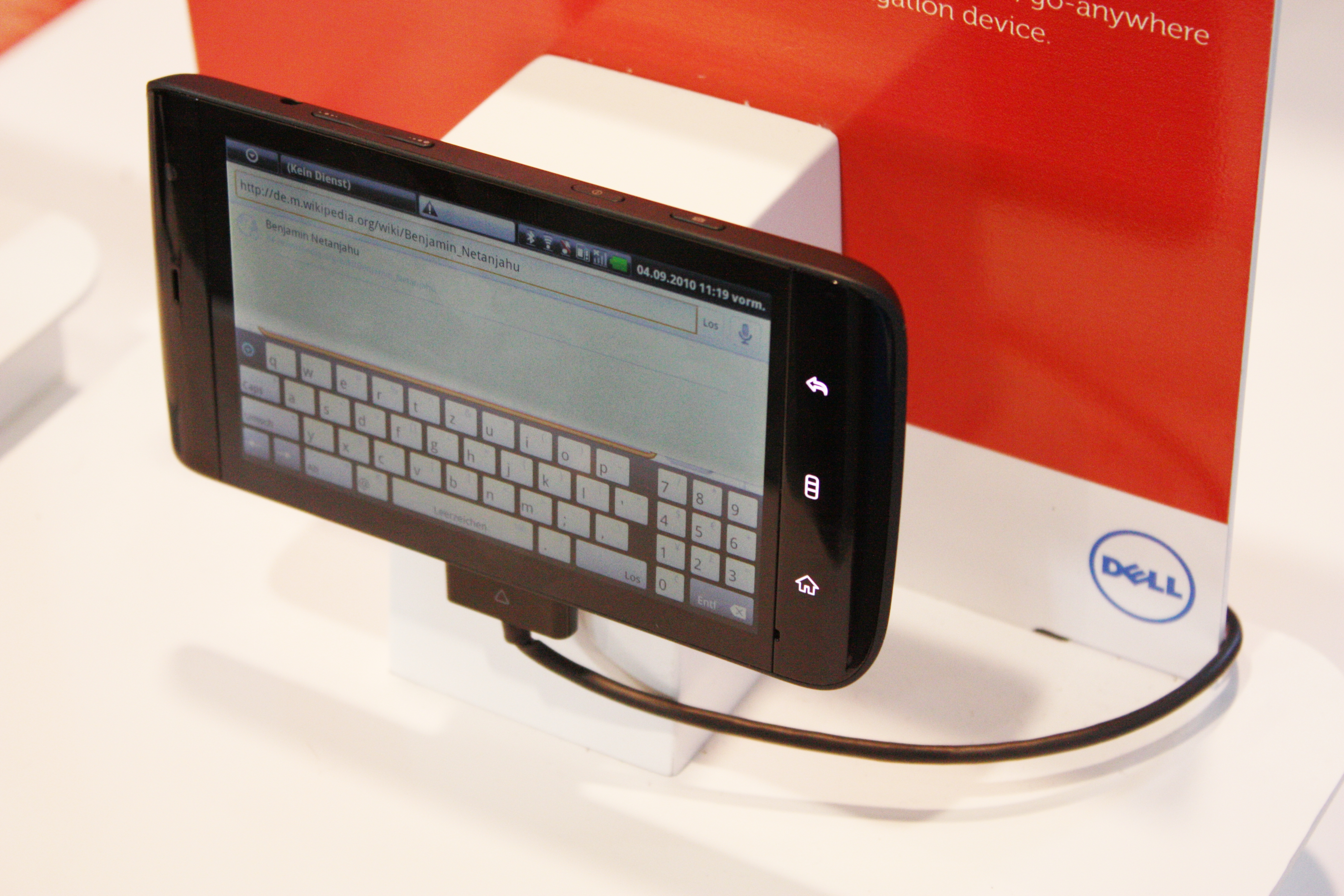
The Dell Streak received mixed reviews for its large size and dated software despite its pioneering design.

=== Origins ===
In tracing the 10 earliest devices in the history of the phablet concept, PC Magazine called the 1993 AT&T EO 440, "the first true phablet", followed by the following devices:

- 2007 HTC Advantage (5.0" screen)
- 2007 Nokia N810 WiMAX Edition (4.13" screen)
- 2009 Verizon Hub (7.0" screen)
- 2010 LG GW990 (4.8" screen)
- 2010 Dell Streak (5.0" screen)
- 2011 Dell Streak 7 (7.0" screen)
- 2011 Acer Iconia Smart (4.8" screen)
- 2011 Samsung Galaxy Player 5 (5.0" screen)
- 2011 Pantech Pocket
- 2011 Samsung Galaxy Note (5.3" screen)
- 2013 Nokia Lumia 1520 (16:9 6.0" screen)

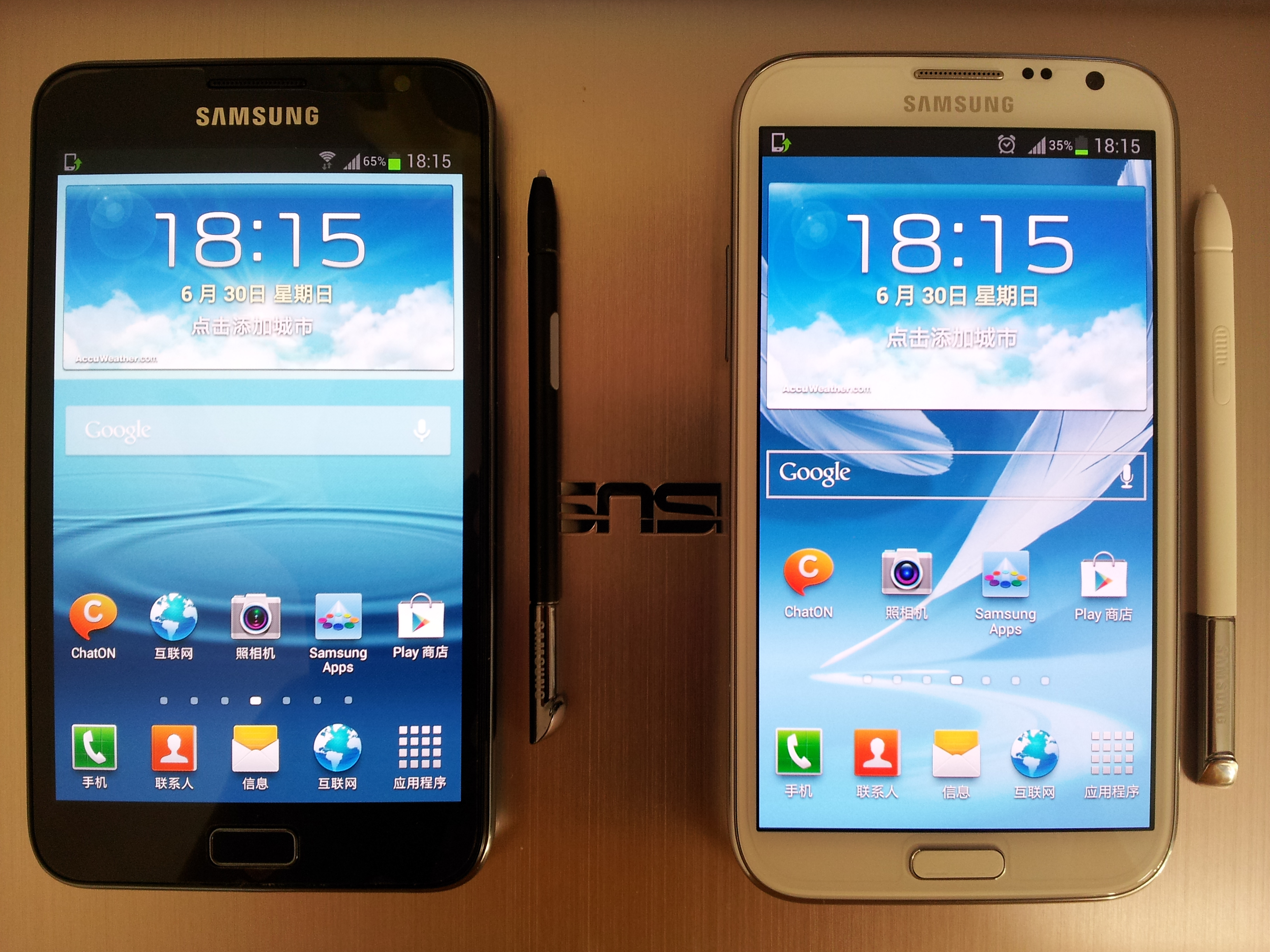
The Samsung Galaxy Note was one of the forerunner of the phablet and then became a leading series in its sector, before its discontinuation in 2021.

However, the form factor did not become popular until the arrival of the Galaxy Note in the 2010s. The Android-based Dell Streak included a 5-inch (130 mm), 800 × 480 display and a widescreen-optimized interface. Reviewers encountered issues with its outdated operating system, Android 1.6, which was not yet optimized for such a large screen size, and the device was commercially unsuccessful.

=== Introduction of the Galaxy Note and its competitors ===
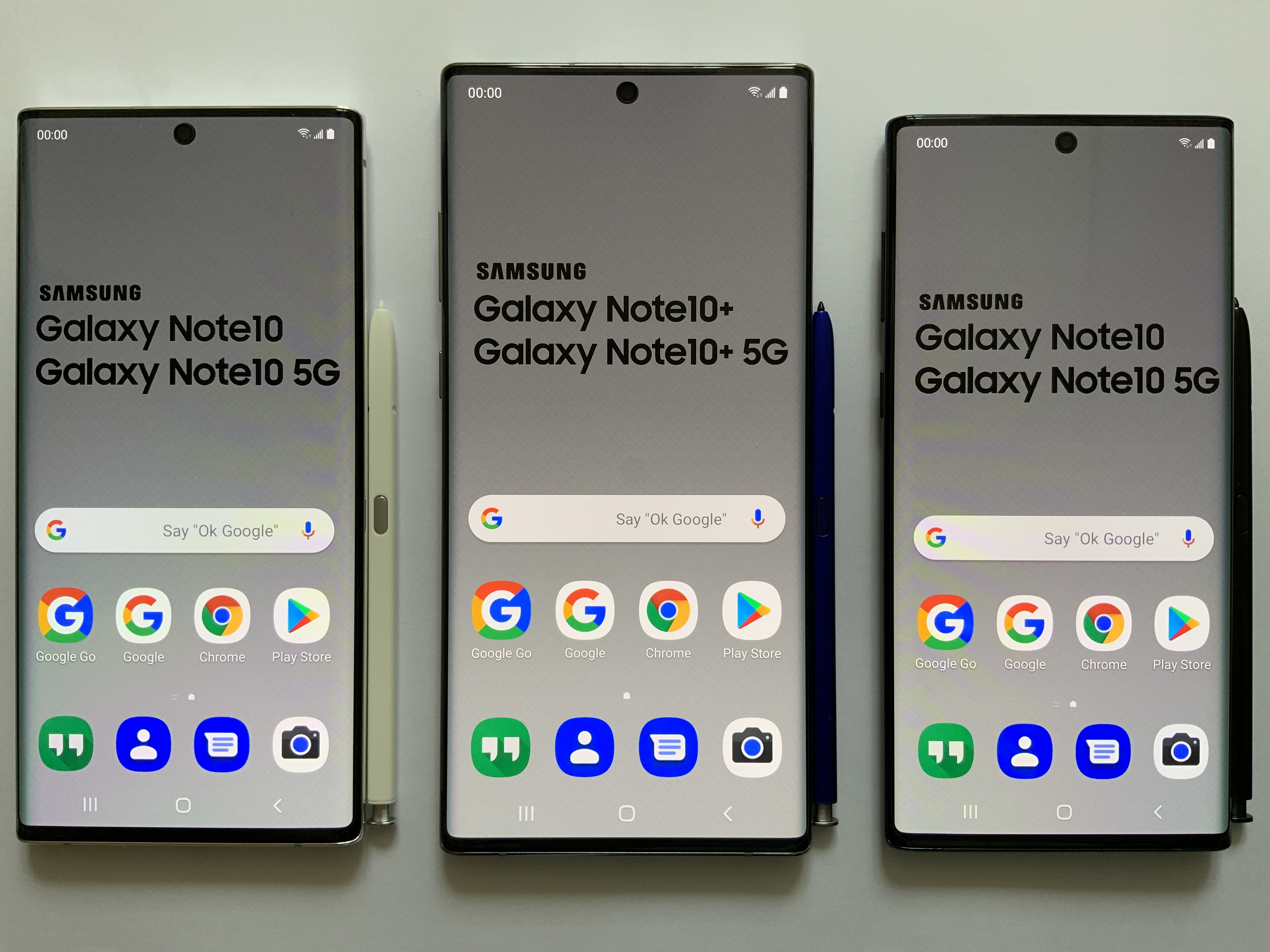
Samsung Galaxy Note 10 series with 6.3-inch and 6.8-inch screens

The Samsung Galaxy Note used a 5.3-inch (130 mm) screen. While some media outlets questioned the viability of the device, the Note received positive reception for its stylus functionality, the speed of its 1.5 GHz dual-core processor, and the advantages of its high resolution display. The Galaxy Note was a commercial success; Samsung announced in December 2011 that the Galaxy Note had sold 1 million units in two months. In February 2012, Samsung debuted a Note version with LTE support. By August 2012, the Note had sold 10 million units worldwide.

In late 2012, Samsung introduced the Galaxy Note II, featuring a 1.6 GHz quad-core processor, a 5.55-inch (141 mm) screen and the ability to run two applications at once via a split-screen view. The Note II also incorporated a refreshed hardware design based on the Galaxy S III, with a narrower, smoother body. International sales of the Galaxy Note II reached 5 million in two months. The 2012 LG Optimus Vu used a 5-inch (130 mm) display with an unusual 4:3 aspect ratio – in contrast to the 3:2 aspect ratio used by most phones. Joining the Galaxy Note II on many carriers' lineups in 2013 was the nearly-identically sized LG Optimus G Pro, released in April.

In late-2012 and early 2013, companies began to release phones with 5 inch screens at 1080p resolution, such as the HTC Droid DNA and Samsung Galaxy S4. Despite the screen size approaching those of phablets, HTC's design director Jonah Becker said that the Droid DNA was not a phablet. HTC would release a proper phablet, the HTC One Max – a phone with a 5.9 in (150 mm) screen and a design based on its popular HTC One model, in October 2013.

Examples of Android phablets with screens larger than 6 inches began appearing in 2013 with the Chinese company Huawei unveiling its 6.1 in (150 mm) Ascend Mate at Consumer Electronics Show and Samsung introducing the Galaxy Mega, a phablet with a 6.3 in (160 mm) variant, which has midrange specs and lacks a stylus compared to the flagship Galaxy Note series. Sony Mobile also entered the phablet market with its 6.4 in (160 mm) Xperia Z Ultra.

As a variation of the concept, Asus and Samsung also released otherwise small-sized tablets, the FonePad, Galaxy Note 8.0 and Galaxy Tab 3 8.0, with cellular connectivity and the ability to place voice calls. Later that year, Nokia also introduced Windows Phone 8 phablets, such as the 6-inch Lumia 1520.

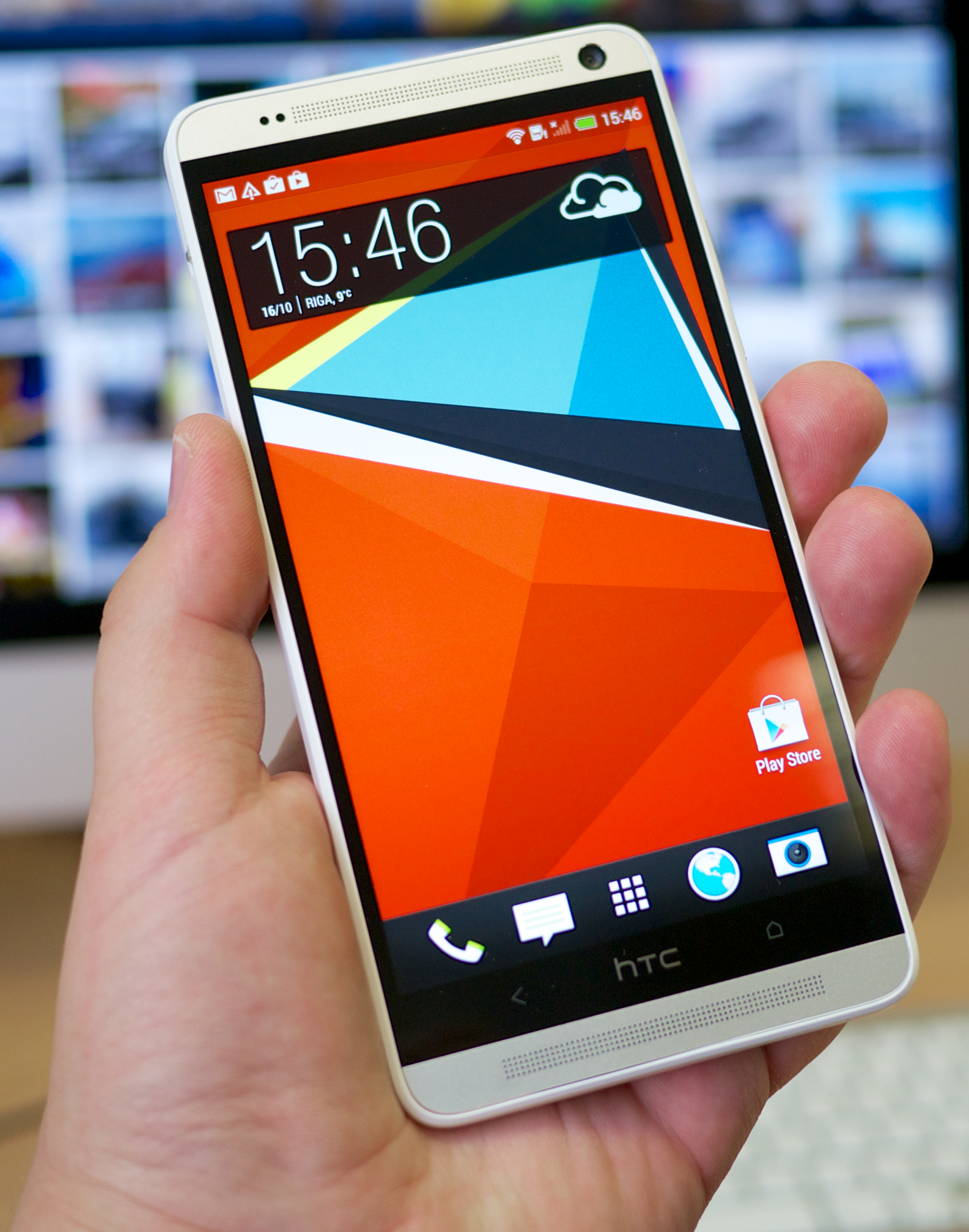
The HTC One Max, a phablet introduced in 2013

=== Introduction of the iPhone 6 Plus ===
In September 2014, Apple released its first phablet, the 5.5 in (140 mm) iPhone 6 Plus; the introduction of the new model reversed a previous policy under late Apple CEO Steve Jobs not to produce a mid-sized device larger than the iPhone or smaller than the iPad, which were 3.5 inches and 9.7 inches, respectively, at the time of his death. While Apple's iPad heavily dominated the tablet market, the void in their lineup left an opening for intermediate-sized devices, with other handset manufacturers already jumping on the trend of producing larger screen sizes to suit all niches.

In September 2018, Apple released the iPhone XS Max, the first phablet iPhone to feature the reduced bezel form factor with the larger 6.5-inch display, utilizing the OLED screen found on its predecessor and replacing the Touch ID into the new facial recognition system called Face ID, which is enabled by the TrueDepth front-facing camera since the iPhone X does not have a larger variant due to the smaller dimension with the 5.8-inch display larger than the 5.5-inch iPhone 8 Plus (the final phablet iPhone to feature the Touch ID introduced in 2017) and its predecessors.

In November 2020, the iPhone 12 Pro Max have increased the display size from 6.5-inch to 6.7-inch, making it 0.2-inch larger than the display size of both the iPhone XS Max and iPhone 11 Pro Max.

In October 2022, Apple released the iPhone 14 Plus; the first phablet iPhone to reduce the price as well as lacking the telephoto camera lens and LiDAR sensor since the iPhone XR, iPhone 11, iPhone 12 lineup and iPhone 13 lineup doesn't have a larger display size options as the iPhone XS Max, iPhone 11 Pro Max, iPhone 12 Pro Max and iPhone 13 Pro Max due to the smaller overall size available with 6.1-inch and 5.4-inch display size options. The iPhone 14 Pro Max have been remained as the premium tier counterpart to the iPhone 14 Plus which these iPhone models with larger display size and larger overall size are the first time available in both standard and premium tier options.

In September 2024, the iPhone 16 Pro Max have maintained the overall size (since the iPhone XS Max and iPhone 12 Pro Max) with the larger 6.9-inch display and the thinner bezel considered as the thinnest border of any Apple product to date.

=== Spiritual successors to the Galaxy Note phones ===
In January 2021, Samsung Electronics announced the Galaxy S21 Ultra; the first phablet despite the Samsung Galaxy Note series, it supports the S Pen accessory, albeit sold separately and with limited functionality. It features a 6.8" 1440p "Dynamic AMOLED" curved display with HDR10+ support, "dynamic tone mapping" technology, and a variable 120 Hz refresh rate.

However, no successor to the 2020 Galaxy Note20/Galaxy Note20 Ultra would be unveiled at the 2021 launch event, which would only focus on unveiling the new foldable phones (including the Galaxy Z Flip 3 and Z Fold 3).

In February 2022, the S22 Ultra became the first Samsung Galaxy S phone to include a built-in S Pen and the major upgrade over the 2021 S21 Ultra, becoming the direct successor to the Note series.

== Sales ==
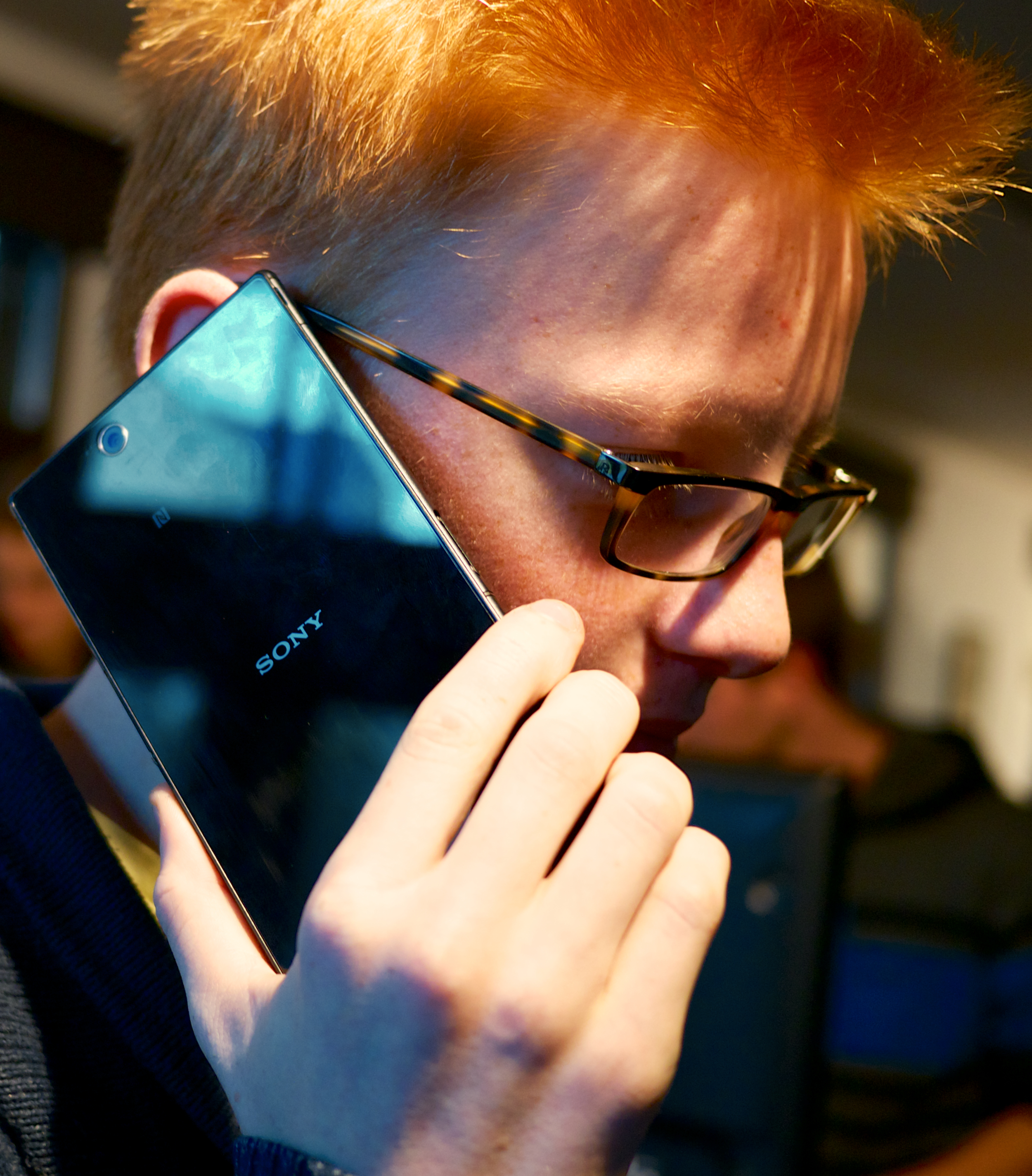
Talking on a 6.4-inch phablet (Sony Xperia Z Ultra)

Engadget identified falling screen prices, increasing screen power efficiency and battery life, and the evolving importance of multimedia viewing as critical factors in the popularity of the phablet. Phablets also satisfy a consumer need – for the perfect sized device, since smartphones may be too small for viewing and tablets lose their portability – fuelling their global market growth. Phablets have also been popular with an older demographic of smartphone users – their large screens provide a benefit to those with deteriorating eyesight.

In April 2013, Doug Conklyn, vice president of global design for Dockers told Fox News that "We recently increased the size of our 'coin pocket,' which is the pocket-within-the-pocket on the wearer's right, from 3×3 to 4×4 to accommodate today's larger phones". For women, a small handbag can easily accommodate a phablet, but not most tablets.

In January 2013, IHS reported that 25.6 million phablet devices were sold in 2012 and estimated that these figures would grow to 60.4 million in 2013, and 146 million by 2016. Barclays projected sales of phablets rising from 27 million in 2012 to 230 million in 2015. In September 2013 International Data Corporation (IDC) reported that its research indicated that phablets "overtook shipments of both laptops and tablets in Asia in the second quarter of 2013".

In 2014, Business Insider predicted phablets would outsell smartphones by 2017. Speaking with CNET in 2014, David Burke, Vice President of Engineering at Google, said "If you gave them a phablet for a week, 50 percent of [consumers] would say they like it and not go back".

In Q1 2014, phablets made up 6% of US phones sold. In the first quarter of 2015, phablets accounted for 21% of all phones sold in the US, with the iPhone 6 Plus making up 44 percent of those phablets sold. By 2016, the majority of the phones sold were phablets, and by 2018 they had come to dominate the market to the extent the term 'phablet' has largely fallen out of use.

== See also ==
- Foldable smartphone
