= LG Octane =

Mobile phone

- Manufacturer: LG Electronics
- Series: Successor to enV Series
- Availability by region: Discontinued as of 2012
- Predecessor: LG enV3
- Related: LG enV3, LG enV2, LG enV, LG enV Touch
- Compatible networks: CDMA and 3G
- Form factor: Clamshell form factor
- Dimensions: 4.21" (H) x 2.16" (W) x 0.63" (D)
- Weight: 4.5 oz (130 g)
- Memory: Double memory system (multimedia and basic memories, approximately 250 MB total)
- Removable storage: Supports up to 16 GB
- Battery: 950mAh; Usage time: up to 7 hours Standby time: up to 340 hours
- Rear camera: 3.2 Megapixels with video capabilities and LED flash
- Display: Internal LCD: 262K color TFT, 320 x 240 Pixels, 2.60"
- External display: External LCD: 262K color TFT, 220 x 176 Pixels, 1.76" TFT LCD

The LG Octane is a 3G phone for Verizon Wireless, released in October 2010 as a basic feature phone to replace the LG enV3. The Octane features a full QWERTY keyboard, as well as a 3.2 megapixel camera/camcorder with a built in flash. The LG Octane has since been retired. It features a side flip form factor, similar to the LG enV3 (2009), LG enV2 (2008), LG enV (2006), and the LG VX9800 (2005). Unlike the LG enV Touch of 2009 and the LG Voyager of 2007, the Octane does not feature a touch screen. The Octane had dual displays.
