= LG Rumor 2 =

Mobile phone model

Rumor 2
- Manufacturer: LG Electronics
- Type: Feature phone
- Predecessor: Rumor
- Successor: Rumor Touch, LG Cosmos
- Form factor: Bar
- Dimensions: 4.4×2.1×0.7 in (112×53×18 mm)
- Weight: 4.2 oz (120 g)
- Removable storage: microSD (up to 32 GB)
- Battery: 950 mAh Li-Pol
- Rear camera: 1.3 Megapixels
- Display: 240 x 320 px TFT LCD
- Connectivity: Bluetooth 1.2 / microUSB
- Data inputs: QWERTY keyboard

The LG Rumor 2 and LG Script (LG Rumeur2 in the province of Quebec, and LG Rumour2 in the rest of Canada) is a Sprint, Bell Mobility, Solo Mobile, Virgin Mobile USA and Virgin Mobile Canada feature phone manufactured by LG Electronics. It was available in black titanium, vibrant blue, purple, gray, and orange. The phones are offered by Sprint in Black, Blue, and Orange and were released in March 2009. The regular price of the phone is $249.99.

It is the follow-up of the LG Rumor (LX260) that came out in September 2007. Although it is a bit bigger and slightly heavier, the QWERTY keyboard has been adjusted to have 4 full lines of the keyboard enabling more space for texting. The front keys have been polished to make what the critics say a glossier and more stylish look. Unlike the original Rumor, the LG Rumor 2 does not have video recording capabilities. It is suspected by the internet community that this was to prevent a loophole where customers could create a blank video with music on their computers and assign them as ring tones, thereby subverting any subscription or download fees. One downside of this phone is the internet browsing. Most websites will only allow half of the page to be viewed.

== Features ==
=== Main features ===
Like the original Rumor, the Rumor 2 has many features including a slide-out QWERTY keyboard in addition to the standard 12-button keypad, a 1.3-megapixel camera, and a 320x240 pixel screen. The QWERTY keyboard easily slides out to the right. The screen rotates as the keyboard opens up. The phone lacks a stopwatch feature.

=== Special features ===
The digital camera is a 1.3-megapixel camera. It does not have an LED flash, but does include black and white, negative, and sepia color tones as well as various frames. It is very similar to the original Rumor camera. There is a self-timer, night mode functions/ brightness, and white balance controls. The Rumor 2 is Bluetooth-compatible and supports MP3 music formats and Sprint Navigation (Sprint’s mapping service).

==== Virgin Mobile additions ====
Virgin Mobile added Ultimate Inbox to the LG Rumor 2 which includes several choices of push E-mail communication with support for Yahoo! Mail, Windows Live Hotmail, AOL Mail, Gmail, and an additional user-defined POP or IMAP account. There is also instant messaging support for AOL Instant Messenger, Yahoo! Messenger, Google Talk, and Windows Live Messenger. According to the device's "About" screen, the functionality is powered by MFluent. The LG Rumor 2 for Virgin Mobile is currently only available in black/silver/blue. Other additions to the phone include Virgin Mobile UI and VM default wallpapers and ringtones.

=== Storage ===
The phone can hold up to 600 contacts with additional numbers, notes, and email addresses. The phone supports up to 32 GB of storage via the MicroSD port on the right side of the phone.

=== Keyboard ===
The QWERTY keyboard has five rows of keys. The number keys now have their own row, as opposed to the original Rumor keyboard where they shared a row across the top of the keyboard. The keys are still made with rubber. Unlike the original Rumor, the Rumor 2 keyboard includes arrow keys for easier navigation, as well as an "enter" and a "back" button.

=== Entertainment ===
The Rumor 2 offers many different sources of entertainment. From the Sprint website, there are 101 games to pick from with different prices. Messaging is the main source of entertainment from the phone. The Rumor 2 is known for its convenient messaging. The music player on the phone can hold up to 4,000 songs using the MicroSD card.

== Specifications ==
Type	Specification
Weight	4.2 oz
Dimensions	4.4" x 2.1" x 0.7"
Form Factor	Bar
Talk Time	5.5 hours
Display	Type: LCD (Color TFT/TFD), 10 line, Colors: 262,144, Size: 176 x 220 pixels
Memory	Phone internal: 16384 KB, Additional MicroSD memory (up to 16 GB)
Phone Book Capacity	600
GPS / Location	Yes, enabled by default. Note: GPS does NOT work with Google Maps on Virgin Mobile.
Digital TTY/TDD	Yes
Hearing Aid Compatible	Rating: M3
Multiple Languages	English, Spanish, French
Vibrate	Yes
Bluetooth †	Supported Profiles: A2DP, AVRCP, GAVDP, HFP, HFP 1.5, PBAP, HSP, HID (keyboard only), BPP, FTP, GOEP, SDAP/SDP, DUN, OPP, SPP, Stereo Streaming, AVDTP, OBEX
Multiple Numbers per Name	Yes
Picture ID	Yes
Ringer ID	Yes, and text message ID
Voice Dialing	No (Voice Control Available)
Custom Graphics	Yes
Custom Ringtones	Yes
Data-Capable	Yes
Flight Mode	Yes
Packet Data	Technology: 1xRTT
WAP / Web Browser	Yes, dial up and USB tethered
Predictive Text Entry	Technology: T9 Predictive / QWERTY Word Prediction
Side Keys	Left side: Volume, Camera
Memory Card Slot	Card Type: MicroSD up to 32 GB
MMS	Yes
Text Messaging	Yes, up to 160 characters (per message portion [delivered as different text messages], 6 portion maximum per message), 40 recipients at a time
Music Player	Yes, Supported Formats: MP3
Camera	Resolution: 1.3 Megapixels
Video	No
Alarm	Yes
Calculator	Basic & Ez Tip calculator for restaurant receipts
Calendar	Yes
Voice Memo	Yes, ability to record memo and calls (up to ten minutes in Voice Memos)
BREW	No
Games	Yes
Unit Converter	Yes

† For Virgin Mobile, Bluetooth profiles are restricted to HSP, HFP, A2DP, AVRCP.

== Availability ==
Sprint Nextel is the exclusive provider of the LG Rumor 2 in the United States. In Canada, the phone is available at Bell Mobility and its brands Solo Mobile and Virgin Mobile Canada. President's Choice, a Canadian mobile virtual network operator (MVNO), also sells the Rumour 2.

=== Colors ===
There are 4 available colors: black and blue, available in Canada and the United States. Colours exclusive to the USA include red, plus a purple version for the Kansas State University.

== Advertising ==
The LG Rumor 2 was featured in the music video of the "Telephone" song performed by Lady Gaga.

== See also ==
- LG Rumor
