= LG Rumor =

Feature phone series by LG Electronics

LG Rumor is a series of feature phones from Sprint in the United States, manufactured by LG Electronics. Each phone is equipped with a slide-out Qwerty keyboard with the latest featured touchscreen.

== Phones ==
The lineup consists of the following:

=== LG Rumor ===
The LG Rumor is the first phone in the series. It was released first for Sprint in September 2007 followed by other carriers on later dates.

=== LG Rumor 2 ===
The LG Rumor 2 was released for Sprint in March 2009, it offered a new, updated version of the Rumor called the LG Rumor 2 with a 4 row QWERTY keyboard instead of a 3-row keyboard. Also, a new interface and IM-like text messaging interface debuted. However, the Rumor 2 does not include video recording capabilities that the original Rumor has. It is not currently offered on Sprint's online store because of the release of the LG Rumor Touch. The LG Rumor 2 was also later released for Virgin Mobile USA and Virgin Mobile Canada as well as Bell Mobility and its now-defunct Solo Mobile brand. The Rumor 2 was also released for Kajeet. Verizon Wireless received a version in Q1 2010 called the LG Cosmos.

=== LG Rumor Touch ===
In early 2009 LG & Sprint offered a new, updated version of the Rumor 2 called the LG Rumor Touch with a 5 row QWERTY keyboard instead of 3 row rumor or 4 row Rumor2. Bell Mobility, Virgin Mobile USA and Virgin Mobile Canada later announced that they would carry the LG Rumor Touch as well. It also includes a touch screen. The phone was discontinued when LG and Sprint introduced the LG Rumor Reflex in Q1 2012. The Rumor Touch reintroduces video recording capabilities. Like the Rumor 2, the Rumor Touch was released for Kajeet.

=== LG Rumor Reflex ===
In December 2011, reports surfaced on the web that Sprint Nextel's prepaid subsidiary Boost Mobile was working with LG to offer an "LG Rumor 4" phone. On March 5, 2012, Sprint's Boost Mobile prepaid brand listed the LG Rumor Reflex on their online shopping page as "coming soon". The phone is now available for $279.99 unsubsidized or $0 with a two-year contract from Sprint, and at $79.99 outright with Boost Mobile. It has a 2 MP camera just like the Rumor Touch and includes video recording as well. Unlike the Rumor Touch and its resistive touchscreen, the Rumor Reflex has a capacitive sensing touchscreen.

=== LG Rumor Reflex S ===
In July 2013, Sprint released an update to the Rumor Reflex S ecological friendly, the LG Rumor Reflex S which includes a 3" screen.

== Celebrity endorsements ==
The LG Rumor 2 for Virgin Mobile USA was endorsed by singers Lady Gaga and Beyoncé Knowles in their music video for collaboration song "Telephone".

The LG Rumor Touch was promoted by actresses Victoria Beckham and Eva Longoria Parker during their 2010 campaign referred to as LG Fashion Touch, throwing around the notion of “personal style and the idea that mobile phones have become the latest in fashion communication".
