= Helio (wireless carrier) =

Defunct American mobile virtual network operator

Helio Inc
- Type: Private
- Industry: Wireless communications
- Predecessor: SK-EarthLink
- Founded: January 26, 2005; 21 years ago
- Defunct: May 25, 2010; 16 years ago
- Fate: Trademarks acquired by Helio Inc
- Headquarters: Los Angeles, California, United States
- Number of locations: 5 stores (2006)
- Area served: Continental United States
- Key people: Ryan Norris (CEO); Wonhee Sull (former CEO); Sky Dayton (former chairman)
- Products: Helio Ocean; Helio Kickflip; Helio Hero
- Services: Helio All-In Membership; Helio A-la-Carte Membership
- Owner: Helio Inc
- Parent: Helio Inc (2025-Present); Ubi Telecom (2015-2017); Virgin Mobile USA (2008-2010); Helio Inc (2005-2008)
- Website: heliomobile.com helio.com (formerly) sk-earthlink.com (formerly) heliosocial.com (formerly)

Helio, Inc. (stylized as HΞLIO) was a mobile virtual network operator (MVNO) using Sprint's network that offered wireless voice, messaging and data products and services to customers in the continental United States beginning on May 2, 2006. Originally a 50/50 joint venture founded in January 2005 between South Korean wireless operator SK Telecom and American internet services provider EarthLink, early losses caused EarthLink to stop providing additional funding in fall of 2007. SK Telecom provided the required additional funding to sustain Helio, which was re-organized as Helio LLC, and by January 2008, SK Telecom had assumed an increased ownership stake and with it, operational control of the joint venture. Although SK Telecom publicly pledged to support Helio, SK Telecom entered into talks to sell the company to rival MVNO Virgin Mobile USA. Virgin Mobile USA closed the acquisition of Helio and its 170,000 subscribers on August 22, 2008. Virgin Mobile USA exited the postpaid wireless business and retired the Helio brand on May 25, 2010.

The Helio brand was resurrected by Ubi Telecom in July 2015. Helio's new $29 per month rate plan offered unlimited talk, text and data but at capped data speeds of 128 kilobits per second. Since then, Helio has appeared to have gone out of business with its website being no longer accessible.

Helio and Helio Mobile trademarks were acquired by Helio Inc in June 2025.

== History ==
=== Foundation ===
SK-EarthLink, Inc., the joint venture that would become Helio, Inc., was established on January 26, 2005. On October 26, 2005, EarthLink and SK Telecom announced that they had entered into an agreement to change the name of their joint venture from SK-EarthLink, Inc. to Helio, Inc. and provide a high-end wireless communications service targeting younger, bigger-spending customers. Helio provided service as a mobile virtual network operator, primarily via the Sprint Nextel CDMA network. The joint venture partners described their choice of the name "Helio" by referencing Copernicus' heliocentric view of the universe, saying that wireless communications is the center of the universe for Helio's target customers.

=== Strategy ===
SK Telecom hoped to grow its customer base in the United States due to stagnant growth in its saturated home market of South Korea. Helio management believed that Helio could avoid taking on the major US wireless carriers directly by targeting price-insensitive, technology-savvy consumers. EarthLink and SK Telecom agreed to provide an initial round of financing totaling $440 million, with each partner owning 50% of the joint venture.

=== Service launch ===
When Helio first began offering service via a soft launch in May 2006. Initially, most of the promotion was done by word of mouth and at promotional events held across the country. On July 13, 2006, Helio began running TV commercials with the slogan, "Don't Call Us a Phone Company; Don't Call it a Phone." Helio also began advertising on billboards, in the print media, specifically in magazines that serve the 18-32 demographic, and on MySpace. Helio opened five corporate flagship stores located in Cherry Creek, Colorado, New York, New York, and in Palo Alto, San Diego and Santa Monica, California.

=== Marketing ===
On February 16, 2006, and in conjunction with its initial handset lineup, Helio announced it had partnered with MySpace. Helio created a custom portal for users to interface with the social networking site. Helio was one of the first wireless communications providers in the United States to use social networking as a major promotional strategy. Cingular, AT&T, Sprint and other competitors did not follow suit until months later.

=== Early financial losses ===
Substantial startup costs for Helio resulted in millions of dollars of losses per month. These losses caused EarthLink to post a loss for its first quarter of 2007. EarthLink and SK Telecom both upped their initial investments after it became clear that more money would be required to establish the new Helio brand. After this second round of financing ran out, EarthLink declined to provide further money to support Helio, stating that the investments in Helio were draining resources away from the company's core business.

=== Change of ownership and control ===
On September 21, 2007, EarthLink announced that SK Telecom would be increasing SK Telecom's investment in Helio by $270 million and they would be adjusting ownership positions in the company accordingly and giving operational control to SK Telecom. In January 2008, CEO Sky Dayton was replaced by Dr. Won Hee Sull, a former executive of SK Telecom. Sky was named non-executive chairman of the board. In a press release announcing the management changes, SK Telecom reaffirmed their commitment to Helio.

=== Acquisition by Virgin Mobile USA ===
In May 2008, rumors arose that Helio parent SK Telecom was in talks with Virgin Mobile USA, Inc. over a possible merger. SK Telecom denied these rumors, but Virgin Mobile USA divulged that the two, in fact, were having preliminary discussions. On June 27, 2008, Virgin Mobile USA announced that it would pay $39 million in stock for Helio after SK Telecom promised to invest immediately $25 million in cash in Virgin Mobile USA. Virgin Mobile USA completed its acquisition of Helio, Inc. on August 22, 2008. Helio had approximately 170,000 subscribers at time of the acquisition. On September 9, 2008, Virgin Mobile USA announced a new brand, "Helio by Virgin Mobile", and a new marketing slogan "Plan To Have It All". Virgin Mobile USA also announced a change of monthly plans and their first integrated phone, the PCD "Shuttle".

=== Helio brand defunct ===
Sprint Nextel announced in March 2010 that Virgin Mobile USA would stop providing service to its Helio post-paid customers. Sprint Nextel offered Helio customers incentives to switch to Sprint branded service and were told that if they did nothing their service would be disconnected on May 25, 2010.

=== Helio comeback ===
The Helio brand was resurrected by Ubi Telecom in July 2015. Helio's $29 per month rate plan offers unlimited talk, text and data but at capped data speeds of 128 kbit/s.
On the hardware front, users could either sign up with your own phone (limited to devices compatible with Sprint, Boost Mobile, Virgin Mobile and Assurance Wireless) or buy an older device such as a Samsung Galaxy S4 for $299, Galaxy S III for $249, Galaxy Epic 4G for $49, or a Kyocera Kona flip phone for $89.

== Products and services ==
=== Plans ===
At launch in 2006, Helio offered three "Helio All-In Membership" monthly plans of unlimited data and SMS messaging combined with 500 voice minutes for $65, 1,000 voice minutes for $85, 1,500 voice minutes for $100 or 2,500 voice minutes for $135.

Helio also offered "Helio A-la-Carte Membership" monthly plans that offered 500 voice minutes for $40, 1000 voice minutes for $60 or 1,500 voice minutes for $80 combined with pay-as-you-go $.02 per kilobyte data and $.10 per domestic incoming or outgoing text message.

For New Helio you can either sign up with your own phone (limited to devices compatible with compatible with Sprint, Boost Mobile, Virgin Mobile and Assurance Wireless), or buy one from their selection that includes a Galaxy S4 for $299, Galaxy S III for $249, Galaxy Epic 4G for $49, or a Kyocera Kona flip phone for $89.

=== Handsets ===
At launch, Helio offered two models, the Helio Kickflip and Helio Hero. These handsets were replaced by the Samsung Drift slider in November 2006 and the Samsung Heat slider in March 2007. In May 2007, Helio introduced the Ocean, its flagship dual-slider. In August 2007, Helio launched the Fin, an ultra-thin folder with a magnesium body. In December 2007, the Mysto slider saw a limited release to the Korean American market, which was followed up by a general market launch in January 2008. On February 12, 2009, Helio launched sales of the Ocean 2 by Virgin Mobile, a device much like the original Ocean but sleeker and having new features.

Helio was criticized for not having the latest phones its marketing promised. Almost all of Helio's handsets were re-branded versions of older Samsung phones that had been offered in South Korea for some time and were not cutting edge at the time of their offering in the United States. Helio handsets' features and specifications were on par with, not better than, offerings from rival American wireless providers. Helios was awarded US Patents for user interface design directed by Matias Duarte.

=== Broadband Internet access ===
In October 2006, Helio began offering a combined 3G and Wi-Fi broadband Internet access service for personal computers. Customers accessed the Internet from their PC via Helio's 3G wireless service, 50,000 commercial Wi-Fi hotspots operated by Boingo or free Wi-Fi hotspots. The service required use of the Helio Hybrid PC card, a re-branded Sierra Wireless AirCard. The Helio Hybrid PC card was offered at no cost when customers subscribed to a two-year term agreement costing $85 per month. In contrast, consumers at the time could choose similar service sold under the Sprint brand for $60 per month, albeit without the Wi-Fi roaming subscription which was offered by Helio.
