= LG enV (VX9900) =

Mobile phone model

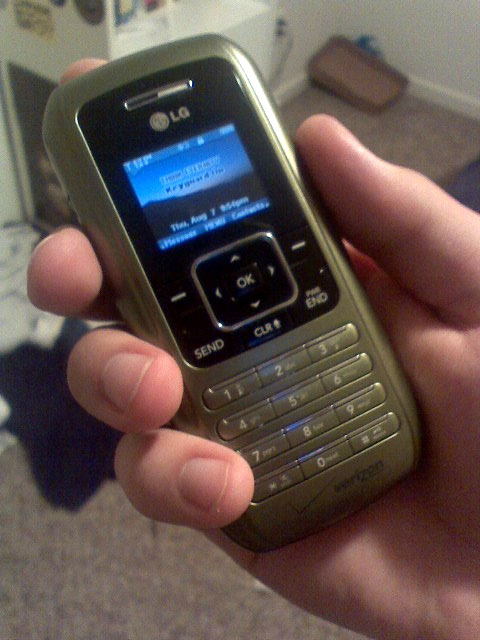
- Manufacturer: LG
- Availability by region: 2006
- Predecessor: The V (VX9800)
- Successor: enV2 (VX9100), Voyager (VX10000)
- Compatible networks: CDMA
- Dimensions: 4.6×2.1×0.8 in (117×53×20 mm)
- Weight: 4.6 oz (130 g)
- Operating system: proprietary
- Memory: 128 MB
- Rear camera: 2.0-megapixel with flash
- Display: 2.25 in. (240 x 320 px LCD, 262k colors)
- External display: 1.25 in. (160 x 128 px LCD, 65K colors)
- Connectivity: Bluetooth / USB Cable
- Hearing aid compatibility: M3/T3

The LG enV (pronounced "envy"), also known as the VX9900, is a Bluetooth-enabled and V CAST-ready mobile phone that includes a full "qwerty" keyboard and a 2.0 megapixel camera. It comes in three color variations: silver, orange, and green.

It is succeeded by different phones, each of which have chosen different paths: the LG Voyager, released November 2007, which has a touch sensitive front, enV3, which was released in May 2009, along with the enV touch.

== See also ==
- Helio Ocean
- LG Rumor (original)
- LG The V (VX9800) (predecessor)
- LG Voyager (VX10000)
- Danger Hiptop (T-Mobile Sidekick)
