= Kyocera Slider Sonic =

Mobile phone made by Kyocera

- Compatible networks: CDMA 800 and 1900
- Dimensions: 1.88 in × 3.89 in × 0.86 in (48 mm × 99 mm × 22 mm)
- Weight: 3.88 oz (110 g)
- Display: 176x220 pixels, 262,000 colors
- Connectivity: 1xRTT, WAP 2.0

The Virgin Mobile Slider Sonic (KX5B), is a Mobile phone made by Kyocera, and the successor to the Virgin Mobile Slider. The Slider Sonic is a music-oriented phone aimed at teens.

Features include:

1. Music player that supports WMA and MP3 audio formats
2. Free embedded music videos from Seether, Submersed and Breaking Benjamin
3. Access to thousands of Superphonic Ringtones (real-music ringtones)
4. Downloadable instant messaging through AOL
5. Video recorder with playback
6. Camera phone with flash and two-way picture messaging
7. Exclusive *MTV content
8. WAP 2.0 browser
9. Text messaging

== Kyocera SE44 ==
Kyocera SE44
- Compatible networks: AMPS 800, CDMA 800 and 1900
- Dimensions: 3.48 in × 1.89 in × 0.90 in (88 mm × 48 mm × 23 mm)
- Weight: 3.39 oz (96 g)
- Display: 128x128 pixels, 65,000 colors
- Connectivity: 1xRTT, WAP 2.0

The Kyocera SE44, referred to as the Kyocera Slider, is the first slider-style phone from Kyocera.

Other technical data include:

- Form Factor: Slider
- Extendable Antenna
- Battery Life: Talk: 4 hours, Standby: 180 hours

=== Carriers ===
The phone has been distributed in North America by the following carriers:

- Alltel (United States)
- Bell Mobility (Canada)
- Cricket Communications (United States)
- US Cellular (United States)
- Verizon Wireless (United States)
- Virgin Mobile (United States)

== Kyocera SE47 ==
Kyocera SE47
- Compatible networks: CDMA 800 and 1900
- Dimensions: 3.48 in × 1.89 in × 0.90 in (88 mm × 48 mm × 23 mm)
- Weight: 3.39 oz (96 g)
- Display: 128x128 pixels, 65,000 colors
- Connectivity: 1xRTT, WAP 2.0

The Kyocera SE47 is the Slider model that was released as a digital only version. The SE44 was later released as a tri-mode option.
