= LG Rumor (original) =

Mobile phone model

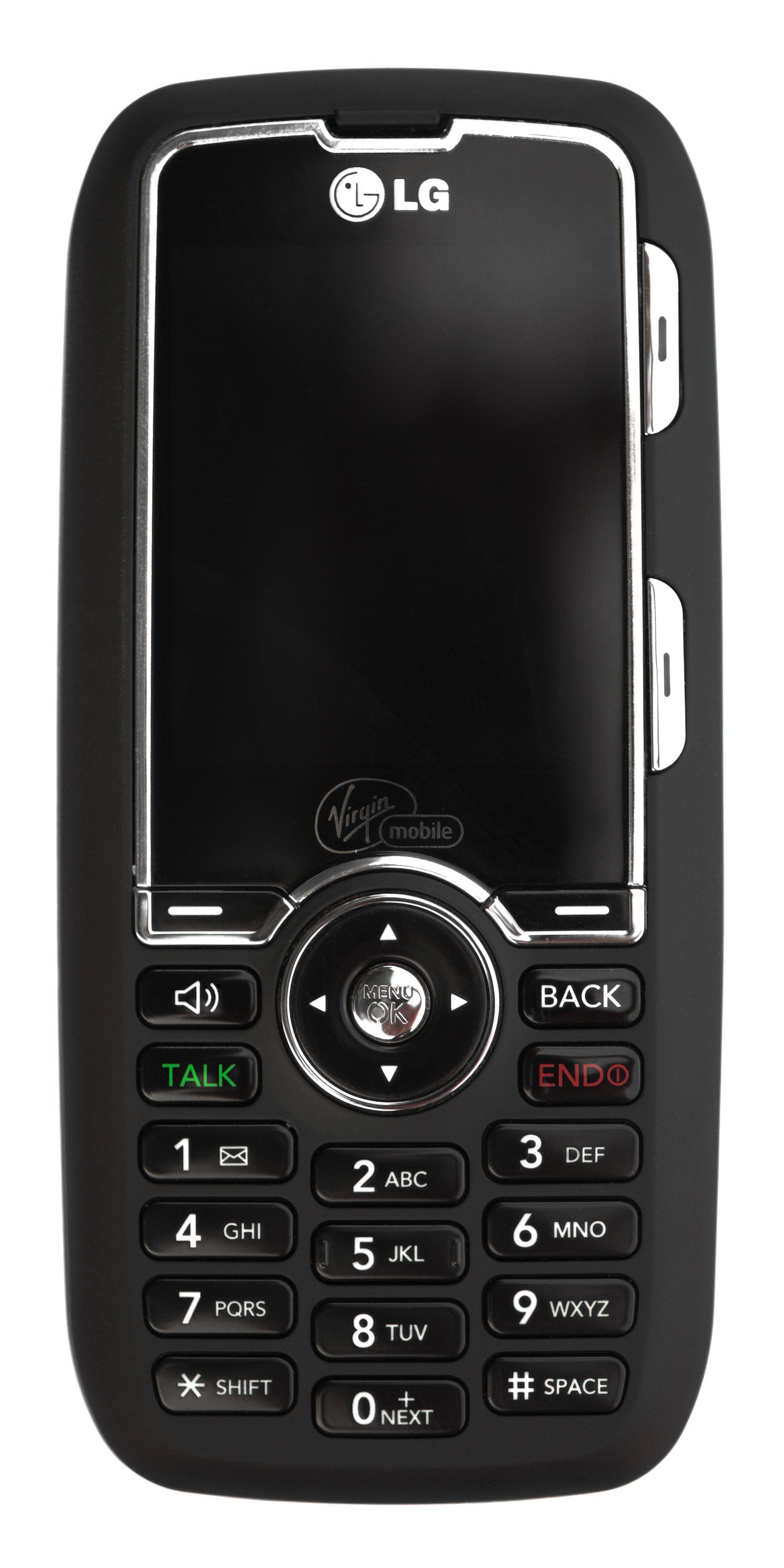
- LG Rumour (Virgin Mobile Canada)
- Type: Feature phone
- First released: September 2007; 18 years ago
- Successor: LG Rumor 2
- Form factor: Slider
- Dimensions: 4.30 in × 2.00 in × 0.70 in (109 mm × 51 mm × 18 mm)
- Weight: 4.13 oz (117 g)
- Memory: 16,384 KB
- Battery: 950 mAh Li-Polymer
- Rear camera: 1.3 megapixels, no flash
- Display: TFT LCD 176x220 pixels, 262K color
- Data inputs: Keypad, QWERTY keyboard, Pointing stick, Push buttons

The LG Rumor (known as the LG Rumour and LG Rumeur in English and French Canadian markets respectively, or LG Scoop in other markets) is a mobile phone released by LG Electronics in September 2007. The phone was available in many different colors, and features a slide-out QWERTY keyboard in addition to the standard 12-button keypad, a 1.3 megapixel camera, and a 176x220 pixel screen. It was the first from the LG Rumor line.

== Features ==
The LG Rumor/LG Scoop is a phone that was released by Sprint Nextel in September 2007. This phone features a QWERTY keyboard that slides out from the right side. 5-way navigation keys are located on the main panel of the phone, but not present on the keyboard. A 176x220 pixel screen rotates as the keyboard is open, but has no contrast controls. The 1.3-megapixel camera lacks an LED flash and a self-portrait mirror but does have negative, sepia, black & white tones, borders and an image enhancer to customize a picture. Basic MP3 playing functions are embedded in this phone, with the capability of expanding music storage via MicroSD card (125 to 1,000 music files depending on file size, encoding method, and card capacity). The music player will not launch unless a card is inserted in the phone, and will not accept a card with the memory that is over 4 GB.

LG Rumor/LG Scoop can be connected with Bluetooth technology, (stores up to 20 Bluetooth entries), or a proprietary LG USB cable. It can hold 500 contacts with additional numbers, notes and email addresses.

=== Drawbacks ===
Commonly occurring issues with the LG Rumor include the device often shutting itself off, no camera flash, the ribbon breaking (causing the image to blur and contort), and the device often not charging. The charge issue is caused by the pins of the connector becoming worn out and bent.

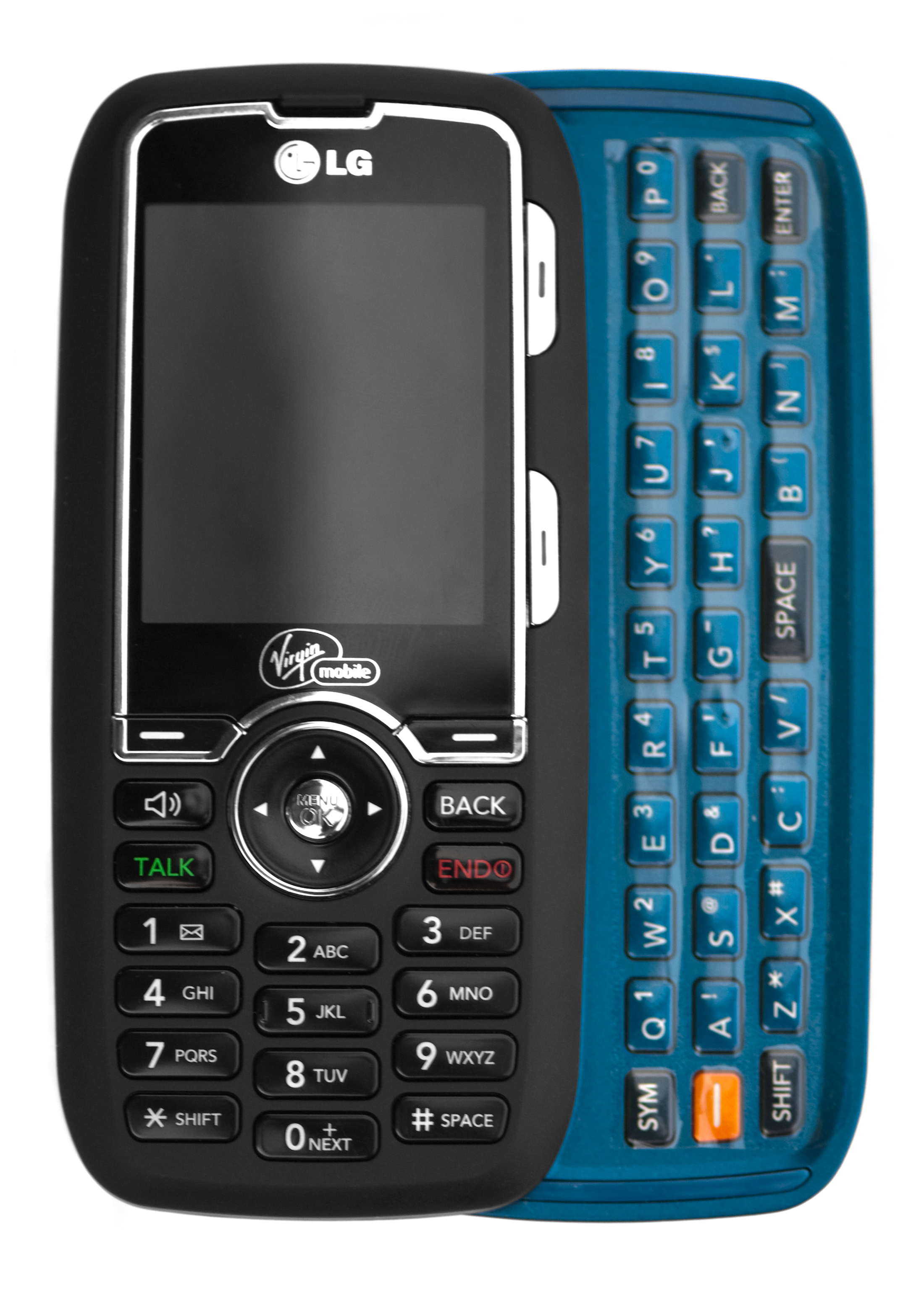
Slide-out keyboard (in black)

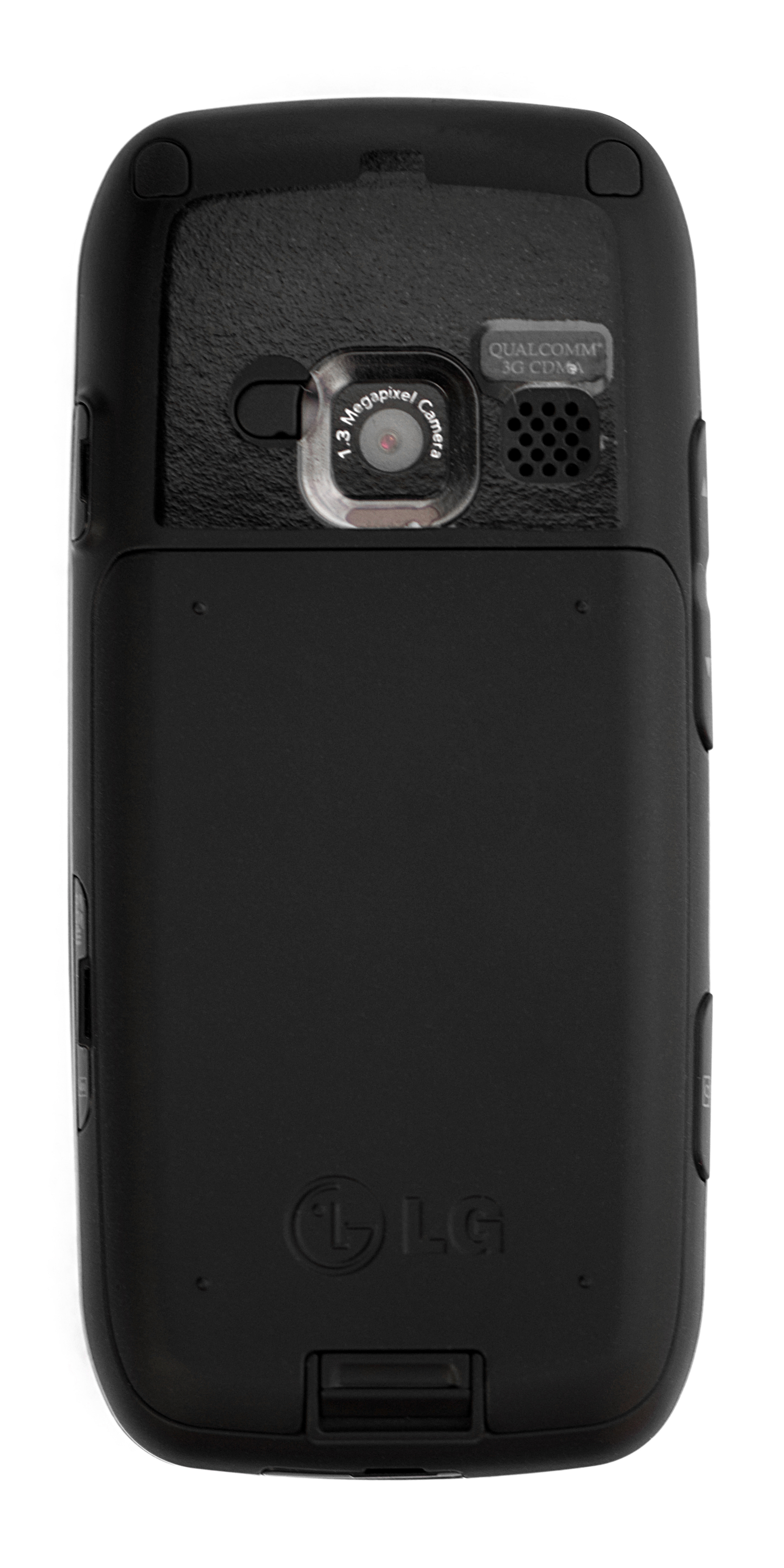
Camera on back of phone (in black)

=== Specifications ===
Type	Specification
Modes	CDMA 800 / CDMA 1900
Weight	4.13 oz (117 g)
Dimensions	4.30 in × 2.00 in × 0.70 in (109 mm × 51 mm × 18 mm)
Form Factor	Slide, Internal Antenna
Battery Life	Talk: 270 minutes, Standby: 240 hours
Battery Type	Li-Poly 950 mAh
Display	Type: LCD (Color TFT/TFD), 10 line, Colors: 262,144, Size: 176 x 220 pixels
Platform / OS	Brew MP
Touch Screen	No
Memory	Phone internal: 16384 KB, Additional MicroSD memory (up to 4 GB)
Phone Book Capacity	500
FCC ID	--
GPS / Location	Yes, enabled by default
Digital TTY/TDD	Yes
Hearing Aid Compatible	Rating: M3
Multiple Languages	English, Spanish,
Polyphonic Ringtones	Yes
Vibrate	Yes
Bluetooth	Supported Profiles: HFP, HSP, OPP, DUN, FTP, OBEX
Multiple Numbers per Name	Yes
Picture ID	Yes
Ringer ID	Yes, and text message ID
Voice Dialing	No
Custom Graphics	Yes
Custom Ringtones	Yes, for Sprint. No (custom ringtones available for purchase on Axcess Apps, standard on Alltel phones )
Data-Capable	Yes
Flight Mode	Yes
Packet Data	Technology: 1xRTT
WAP / Web Browser	Yes, dial up and USB tethered
Predictive Text Entry	Technology: T9 Predictive
Side Keys	Left side: Volume, Camera
Memory Card Slot	Card Type: MicroSD up to 4 GB
MMS	Yes
Text Messaging and Picture Messaging	Yes, up to 140 characters, 25 recipients at a time, plus picture messaging
Text Messaging Templates	Yes (canned messages)
Music Player	Yes, Supported Formats: MP3, AAC, AAC+, M4A, MID
Email	Yes
Camera	Resolution: 1.3 MP self-timer, night mode functions / brightness, white balance controls
Streaming Video	Yes
Video Capture	Yes, 15 second/256 KB "Video Mail" clips, recording time varies by memory card size
Alarm	Yes
Calculator	Yes [basic], plus tip calculator
Calendar	Yes, plus world time
Voice Memo	Yes, ability to record memo and calls
BREW	No
Games	Yes
Unit Converter	Yes

== Availability ==
As the LG Rumor/LG Scoop became a popular phone for social teens and for business clients who require basic email support, it was sold by CDMA cellphone carriers in North America, such as Sprint, Bell Mobility, Solo Mobile, Virgin Mobile Canada, kajeet, US Cellular, and Alltel (known as LG Scoop).

There are different colors sold by different cellphone providers.

Rumor

- Black (Sprint, Bell, Solo, Virgin, Cricket, US Cellular)
- White (Sprint, Bell, Solo, Virgin, Cricket, US Cellular)
- Lime Green (Sprint, Cricket, Virgin)
- Orange (Solo)
- Blue (Virgin, Sprint, Cricket)
- Purple (Carolina West Wireless)

Scoop

- Turquoise (Alltel)
- Lavender (Alltel, Virgin)
- Red (Alltel)
- Slate/Black (Alltel)
- Citrus/Orange (Alltel)
- Grey (Carolina West Wireless)

== See also ==
- LG Rumor
- LG Rumor 2
