= LG Extravert =

Mobile phone released by LG Electronics in 2012

- Manufacturer: LG Electronics
- Availability by region: Discontinued
- Predecessor: LG Cosmos Touch
- Related: LG Cosmos
- Compatible networks: CDMA
- Form factor: Side-sliding form factor
- Removable storage: Supports up to 32 GB
- Rear camera: 2.0 Megapixels
- Development status: Discontinued

The LG Extravert is a basic phone made by LG Electronics and was carried by Verizon Wireless. It runs on the Brew MP mobile operating system. The phone is distinctive for having a sliding QWERTY keyboard. It was introduced around early 2012. It is a successor to the wildly successful LG Cosmos, specifically the Cosmos Touch.

There is a successor model, the LG Extravert 2, which has been discontinued.
