= Dan Schulman =

American business executive (born 1958)

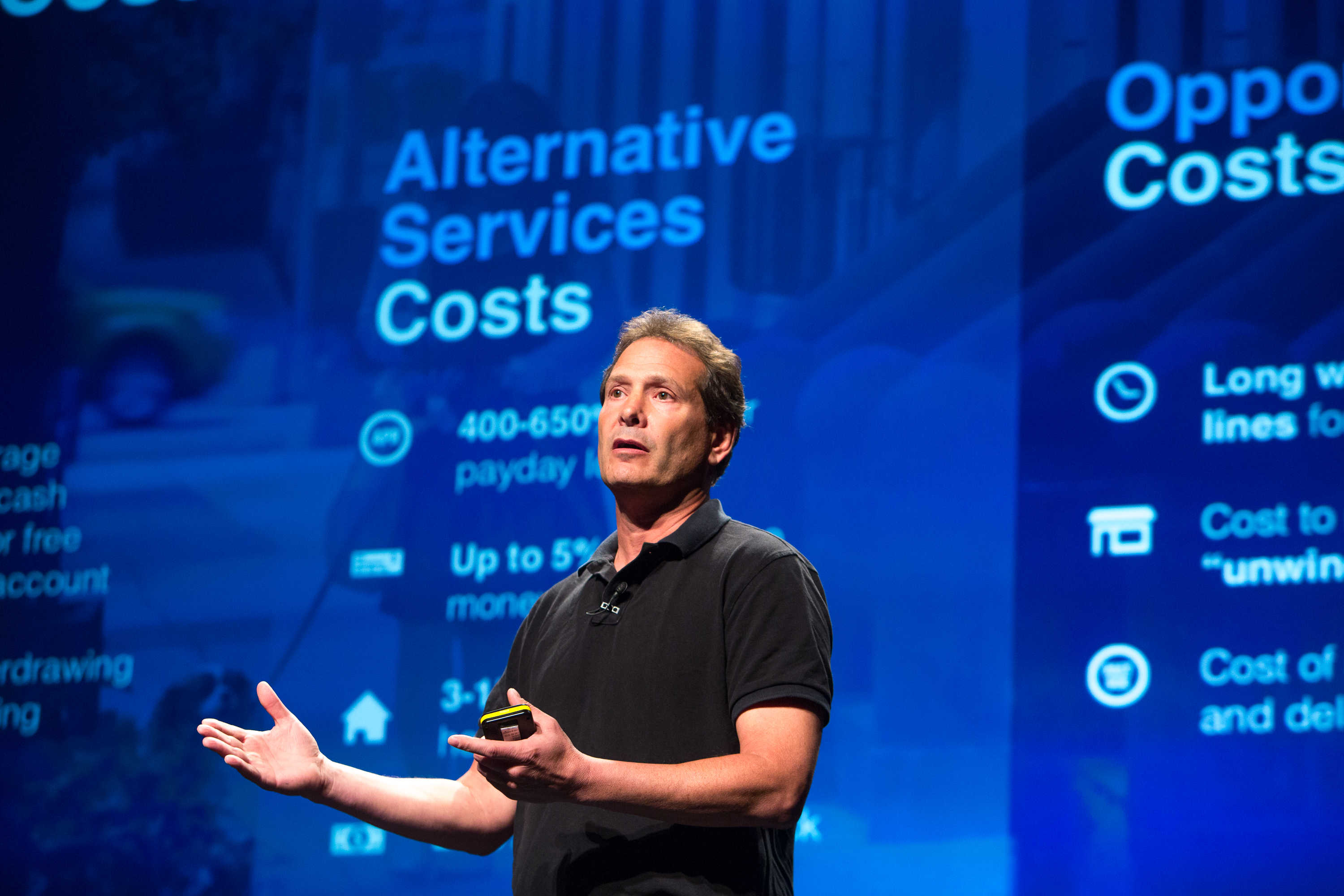
- Schulman in 2013
- Born: 19 January 1958 (age 68); Newark, New Jersey, U.S.
- Education: Middlebury College (AB); New York University (MBA)
- Occupation: Businessman
- Known for: Former president and CEO of PayPal
- Title: CEO of Verizon
- Board member of: Symantec; Verizon; Rutgers University; Autism Speaks
- Children: 2

Daniel H. Schulman (born January 19, 1958) is an American business executive. He is the chief executive of Verizon and former president and CEO of PayPal, and before that group president of enterprise growth at American Express. Schulman was responsible for American Express' global strategy to expand alternative mobile and online payment services, form new partnerships, and build revenue streams beyond the traditional card and travel businesses. Earlier, he was president of Sprint's prepaid group and the founding CEO of Virgin Mobile.

== Early life ==
Schulman was born in Newark, New Jersey, to Jewish parents, and grew up in Princeton, New Jersey with two siblings, a brother Joel Schulman, and a sister, the late Amy Adina Schulman, who died in 1986. He received a bachelor's degree in economics from Middlebury College, and an MBA from New York University Stern School of Business.

His mother, S. Ruth Schulman, was associate dean of Rutgers' Graduate School of Applied and Professional Psychology (GSAPP) from 1974 to 1999. His father, Mel Schulman, was a chemical engineer.

Schulman once told The New York Times, "I was born with social activism in my DNA. My grandfather was a union organizer in the garment district in New York City. My mother took me to a civil rights demonstration in Washington in my stroller."

== Career ==
Schulman began his business career at AT&T, working more than 18 years there and becoming the youngest member of the company's senior executive team. Schulman started at an entry-level account management position; when he left AT&T, he was president of the company, managing 40,000 employees.

He then became president and COO, and then CEO, of Priceline.com. During his two years there, Priceline's annual revenues grew from a reported $20 million to about $1 billion.

In 2001, Richard Branson invited Schulman to become the founding CEO of Virgin Mobile USA, Inc. Schulman led the company from its national launch in 2002 to it becoming a public company in 2007, and ultimately its sale to Sprint Nextel in 2009. His tenure at the company was noted by the company's growth as the "no hidden fees" carrier. By the time Schulman left Virgin Mobile, it had become one of the nation's top wireless carriers, with more than 5 million customers and $1.3 billion in annual sales. Following the sale of Virgin Mobile to Sprint Nextel, Schulman was president of Sprint's Prepaid group until he moved to American Express.

In September 2014, it was announced that Schulman would become CEO of PayPal, which would continue as a separate legal entity, split from eBay in 2015. He has stated that his goals at PayPal include giving financial tools to the 70 million Americans underserved by the U.S. financial system.

During the 2018–19 United States federal government shutdown, Schulman initiated the idea for PayPal to offer $500 in interest-free cash advances to furloughed U.S. government workers, committing to provide up to $25 million in interest-free loans. In 2019, Schulman unveiled PayPal's Employee Financial Wellness initiative to help struggling workers by lowering healthcare costs, and creating avenues for employees to receive equity in the company to promote long-term saving.

In February 2023, it was announced that Schulman would step down as PayPal chief executive by 31 December 2023. He will reportedly remain on the board of directors.

In October 2025, Schulman was appointed chief executive of Verizon. After announcing 13,000 layoffs in November, Schulman later launched a $20 million fund to retrain employees impacted by AI.

=== Board directorships ===
Schulman previously was non-executive chairman of NortonLifeLock (now Gen Digital). In September 2018, he was elected as a member of the Verizon board of directors. Schulman was also on the advisory committee of Greycroft Partners, a private equity company focused on early-stage new media and technology companies.

Schulman was on the board of governors of Rutgers University from April 2008 to June 2013. He also is on the board at Autism Speaks, an advocacy group dedicated to advancing research into causes and treatments for individuals on the autism spectrum. Schulman is a board of directors member of the Business Roundtable and The Economic Club of New York, and is an international advisory council member of the Singapore Economic Development Board. He is a life member of the Council on Foreign Relations.

== Personal life ==
When he was chief executive of Virgin Mobile, Schulman led a partnership with StandUp For Kids, a nonprofit that distributes survival kits and a hotline number to homeless youth. Schulman once spent 24 hours on the streets of New York City, unshaven, wrapped in a blanket, and without money, a watch, or a cell phone.

Schulman has practiced Krav Maga since his teens has stated that he adheres the same philosophy in business. He said in an interview, "there's a philosophy in martial arts which is, 'Never stand still.' Standing still is asking to be hit. You always have to be willing to take some risks going forward. You can't stand still".

He has been a resident of Warren Township, New Jersey, US. "As of 2023, Schulman is a resident of San Jose, California, and early in 2023 announced his intended retirement as CEO of PayPal by the end of December.

=== Politics ===
Schulman denounced the North Carolina Public Facilities Privacy & Security Act that mandated people in public facilities use bathrooms in accordance to their gender at birth. He stated that "The new law perpetuates discrimination and it violates the values and principles that are at the core of PayPal's mission and culture." Schulman also cosigned an opposition letter with about 120 executives from major corporations. In protest at the new law in North Carolina, Schulman announced that the company was canceling its expansion to hire 400 people in the state.

Schulman wrote in the PayPal statement, "While we will seek an alternative location for our operations center, we remain committed to working with the LGBT community in North Carolina to overturn this discriminatory legislation, alongside all those who are committed to equality."

In 2018, to support Dreamers, people who entered the U.S. as children and currently live, work, and contribute to the United States, Dan signed his name to a letter calling on U.S. Congress to take swift action on the Deferred Action for Childhood Arrivals (DACA) program. In 2020, he opposed President Trump's visa ban to limit foreign workers in the U.S.

== Awards ==
Schulman was named by Business Week as one of the top 20 people to watch in media, and was named the Ernst & Young 2009 Entrepreneur of the Year. In 2009 he was named one of the top 25 most powerful people in the global wireless industry. In 2017, the Council for Economic Education honored Schulman with its Visionary Award for promoting economic and financial literacy to create a better informed society.

Fortune included him in the top ten in its 2017 Businessperson of the Year list, its 2018 list, and its 2019 list. In 2017, Schulman was recognized by the Brennan Center for Justice with its Brennan Legacy Award, named after the Supreme Court justice, for his contributions to democratize financial services and build a more inclusive global economy. Schulman was named to Fortune's 2021 list of the World's 50 Greatest Leaders, which recognizes those who in unprecedented times "stepped up to make the world better, and inspired others to do the same." Schulman debuted in 2021, ranking #3 and the highest-ranked business leader.

In 2018, the Center for Financial Services Innovation awarded Schulman the first-ever Financial Health Network Visionary Award for his contributions to a "more accessible and inclusive" financial system.

In 2018, Rutgers University awarded him an honorary doctorate, and he delivered the university's 252nd anniversary commencement speech.

In 2019, Schulman was recognized by Endeavor Global with the High-Impact Leader of the Year Award for his work to support entrepreneurs around the globe. He was also named one of Glassdoor's Top 50 CEOs in 2019.

In 2020, the Robert F. Kennedy Center for Justice and Human Rights honored Schulman with the Ripple of Hope Award, which recognizes those who have demonstrated a commitment to social change and a passion for equality, justice and basic human rights.

Under his leadership, PayPal was named to Time's inaugural 100 Most Influential Companies, an honor that recognizes companies making an extraordinary impact around the world.

Schulman was awarded the New York Urban League's 2021 Frederick Douglass Award for his commitment, dedication, and influence to advance the rights of generations of underserved Black Americans.

In December 2021, Schulman was presented the "Voices of Solidarity" award by Vital Voices for his work advocating on behalf of women and girls around the world.

He delivered the 2022 Middlebury College commencement address, and received an honorary doctorate at the same, and was awarded the 2022 Excellence in Economic Empowerment Award by 100 Black Men of New York.
