= LG enV2 (VX9100) =

Mobile phone

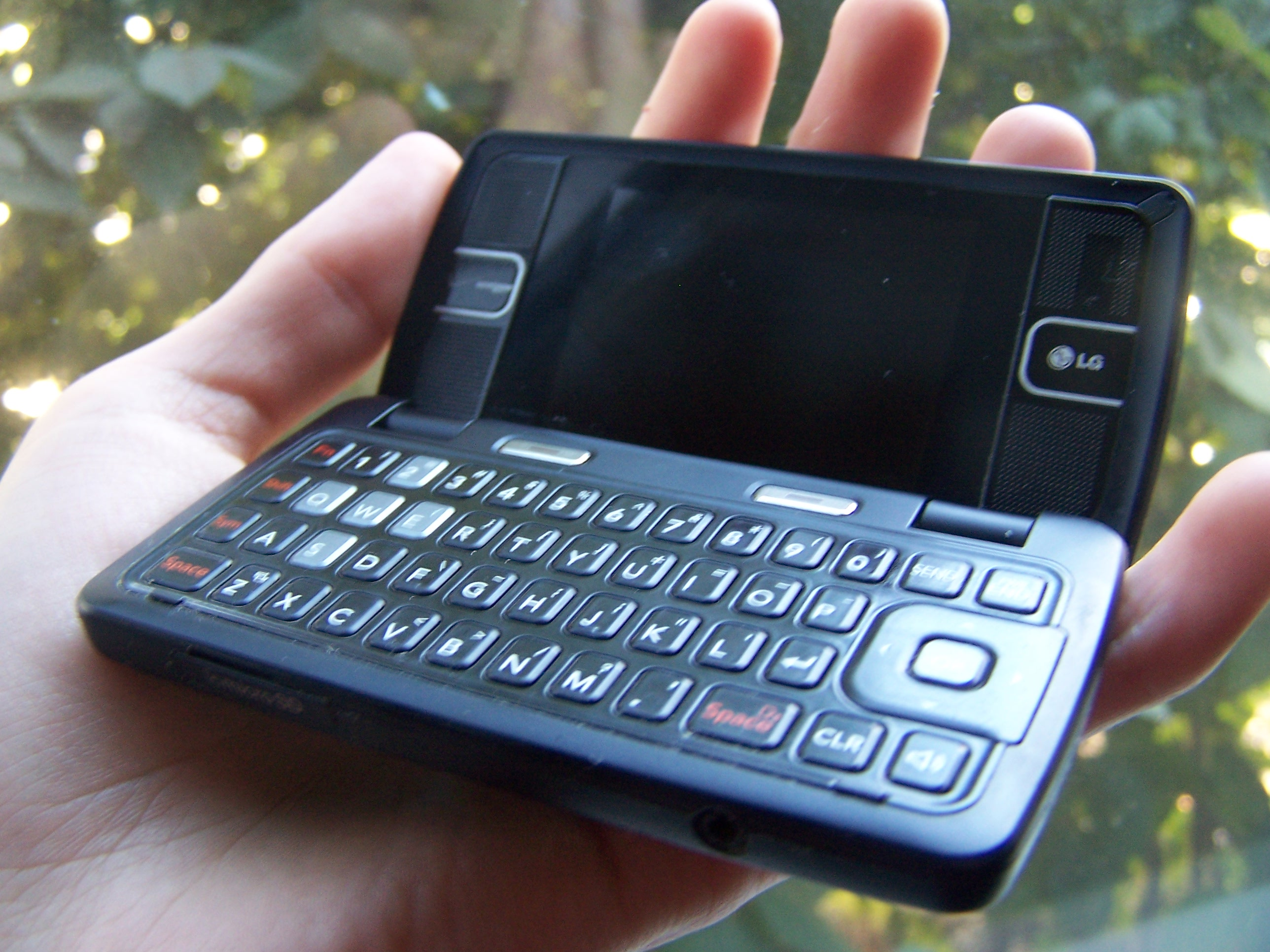
- Manufacturer: LG Electronics
- Availability by region: March 31, 2008
- Predecessor: enV (VX9900)
- Successor: enV3 (VX9200)
- Compatible networks: CDMA
- Form factor: Clamshell
- Dimensions: 3.75×2.13×0.65 in (95×54×17 mm)
- Weight: 4.23 oz (120 g)
- Operating system: BREW
- CPU: Qualcomm MSM6550 (32-bit ARM, 225Mhz, 1 core)
- Memory: 63 MB
- Removable storage: microSD
- Battery: 950 mAh Li-Pol
- Rear camera: 2 Megapixel
- Display: 2.4 in. (320 x 240 px) TFT LCD (260K Color)
- External display: 1.45 in. (160 x 64 px) TFT LCD (60K Color)
- Connectivity: Bluetooth 1.2 / microUSB
- Data inputs: QWERTY keyboard
- Hearing aid compatibility: M3/T3

The LG enV2 was a Verizon Wireless digital messaging feature phone manufactured by LG. It was available in standard black as well as maroon (pomegranate, in Canada). Both the colors were available at Verizon Wireless in the U.S., and Telus stores and Koodo stores in Canada, and were released on the same date. It was also capable of installing VZ Navigator. The original price of the phone at release was $129 after a $50 mail-in-rebate. It had dropped to $79.99, and then to $49.99, but as of February 2009, the price had returned to $129.99. Best Buy stores used to offer the enV² for a price of $49.99 with a 2-year contract. After June 2012, a data plan for the phone was optional.

As of 2019, the LG env2 is no longer available, and can no longer be activated on the Verizon network due to the imminent shutdown of the 1x and 2G networks.

It succeeded both the LG enV (VX9900) and the original LG The V (VX9800). The phone's successor, the LG enV3 (VX9200) was released in 2009.

The styling of this phone was updated from the previous versions. It's slimmer (40% slimmer than original enV), lighter (30% lighter than original enV), and more pocketable than the previous versions. Its styling is made more comfortable and easier to handle and text, its shaped like a rectangle with both front and back of phone being a flat surface (unlike the original enV). The back of the phone is painted in SoftTouch paint in the phone's respective color (a smooth and grippy paint) making it more comfortable to handle. Its styling follows that of the LG Voyager (VX10000), which is the other successor to the LG enV (VX9900) and the LG The V (VX9800) phones. The Env2 was released in Canada in August, 2008 as the LG Keybo from Telus. Its successor, the enV3, was released on May 29, 2009.

== Features ==
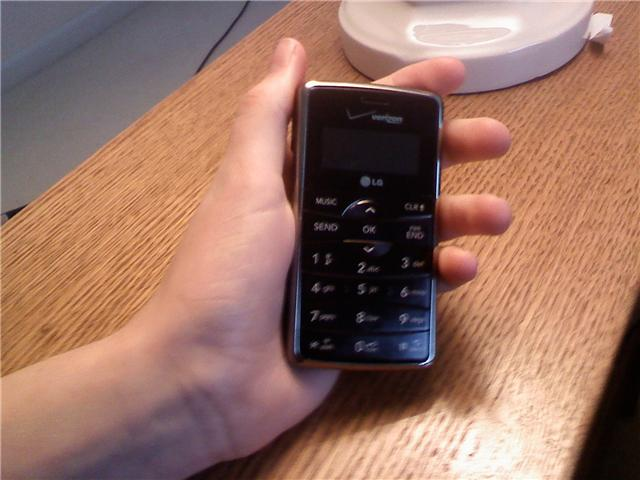
Front view of the enV2.

The enV2 has several features, such as the QWERTY keyboard and a 2.0 megapixel camera with up to 10x zoom. It is Bluetooth-compatible and supports V CAST, Verizon's music and video service, as well as VZ Navigator, Verizon's map service. The phone has a microSD memory card port for storing music and video from a computer and is enabled to set videos under 5MB as wallpaper. It can store up to 300 text messages, has an "auto text readout" functionality (phone reads texts out loud for you), and message sorter. The phone supports FOTA, which allows for new firmware updates to be sent to the device without needing to make a trip to a retail store to receive the update.

The phone also has the capability to display four different themes which may change button styles, background colors, and general style of the phone. These themes are the Classic view, having the red and white menu screen when the OK button is pressed, the Slick Black theme, with a more digital, and of course, black look. There is also the Wall theme, with the menu and other features looking like a concrete wall. The last theme is the wave, a rounded and dark look.

The phone supports up to 8GB of storage via the MicroSD port on the right side of the phone. The forms of media able to be stored on this card include: Photos ("PIX"), Music, Sounds, and Videos ("FLIX"). This phone supports the Bluetooth profile A2DP which supports the listening of music through wireless headphones. The phone also has a "Standalone Mode" which allows one to take advantage of the phone's multimedia capabilities (Music, Photos, Videos, Games) without sending or receiving RF signals. This mode is most useful while on an airplane.

The phone has a full QWERTY keyboard optimized for text messaging, and comes in the alternate colors maroon and black.

Specific ringtones may be set for individual callers on the phone's contact list. However, unlike many previous LG models, it is not possible to set individual ringers for incoming TXT messages.

== Specifications ==
The following are the specifications for the LG enV^{2}:

Type	Specification
Backlit Keypad	Yes
Battery Type	Lithium-Ion
Calculator	Yes
Calendar	Yes
Changeable Faceplate Capable	No
Customizable Ring Tones	Built-In, Downloadable
Data Capabilities	Yes
Extras	2.0MP Camera, Bluetooth, MP3 Player
Games	Yes, Downloadable
Hands-free Speakerphone	Yes
Included in Box	AC Charger Rechargeable Battery
Keypad Lock	Yes
Number of Display Lines	320 x 240 Pixels
Display Color Depth	18 bit
Number of Modes/Bands	Dual band
Phone Book Capacity	1000
Product Dimensions	10.2(W) x 5.4(H) x 1.65(D) cm
Product Weight	120g
Standby Time	Up To 216 Hours
Supports Caller ID	Yes
Talk Time	Up to 5 hours
Vibrate Mode	Built-in
Web Browser	Yes
Memory	Internal/External, USB Mass Storage

== See also ==
- Helio Ocean
- LG Voyager (VX10000)
- LG enV (VX9900)
- LG The V (VX9800)
- Danger Hiptop (T-Mobile Sidekick)
