= Samsung SPH-A503 =

Mobile device

Samsung SPH-A503 (The Drift)
- Manufacturer: Samsung Electronics
- Availability by region: November 2006
- Compatible networks: CDMA 1xEV-DO 800/1900 MHz
- Form factor: Slider
- Dimensions: 3.8" (H) x 1.8" (W) x 0.7" (D)
- Weight: 3.53 oz (100 g)
- Memory: 128 MB
- Removable storage: microSD
- Display: 240x320 pixel (2.12") TFT-LAC, 262K color
- Connectivity: 1xEV-DO, HSDPA, HSUPA, USB

The Samsung SPH-a503, known as The Drift, is a slider multimedia wireless mobile device, which comes in black or white. It is sold by Helio, a joint venture between Earthlink (a U.S.-based internet service provider) and SK Telecom (a South Korea–based CDMA mobile telecom). The Drift is the first to have Location-Based Services bundled with the device. The Drift comes loaded with a version of Google Maps that uses the device's GPS to locate the user on a map and the Buddy Beacon application that lets friends share their current location with each other via MapQuest. The Drift was added to Helio's line-up in November 2006.
