= LG Cosmos =

Mobile phone handset

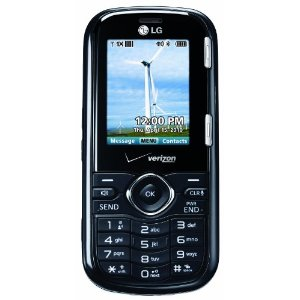
- Manufacturer: LG Electronics
- Successor: LG Cosmos Touch, LG Cosmos 2
- Compatible networks: CDMA
- Form factor: Slider
- Dimensions: 4.41×2.05×0.67 in (112×52×17 mm)
- Weight: 4.4 oz (120 g)
- Memory: 19 MB of internal memory
- Removable storage: Supports 16 GB of external memory
- Rear camera: 1.3 Megapixels no video camera
- External display: 240x320-pixel, 262K-color TFT LCD
- Development status: Discontinued (still available as a certified pre-used device)

LG Cosmos Touch
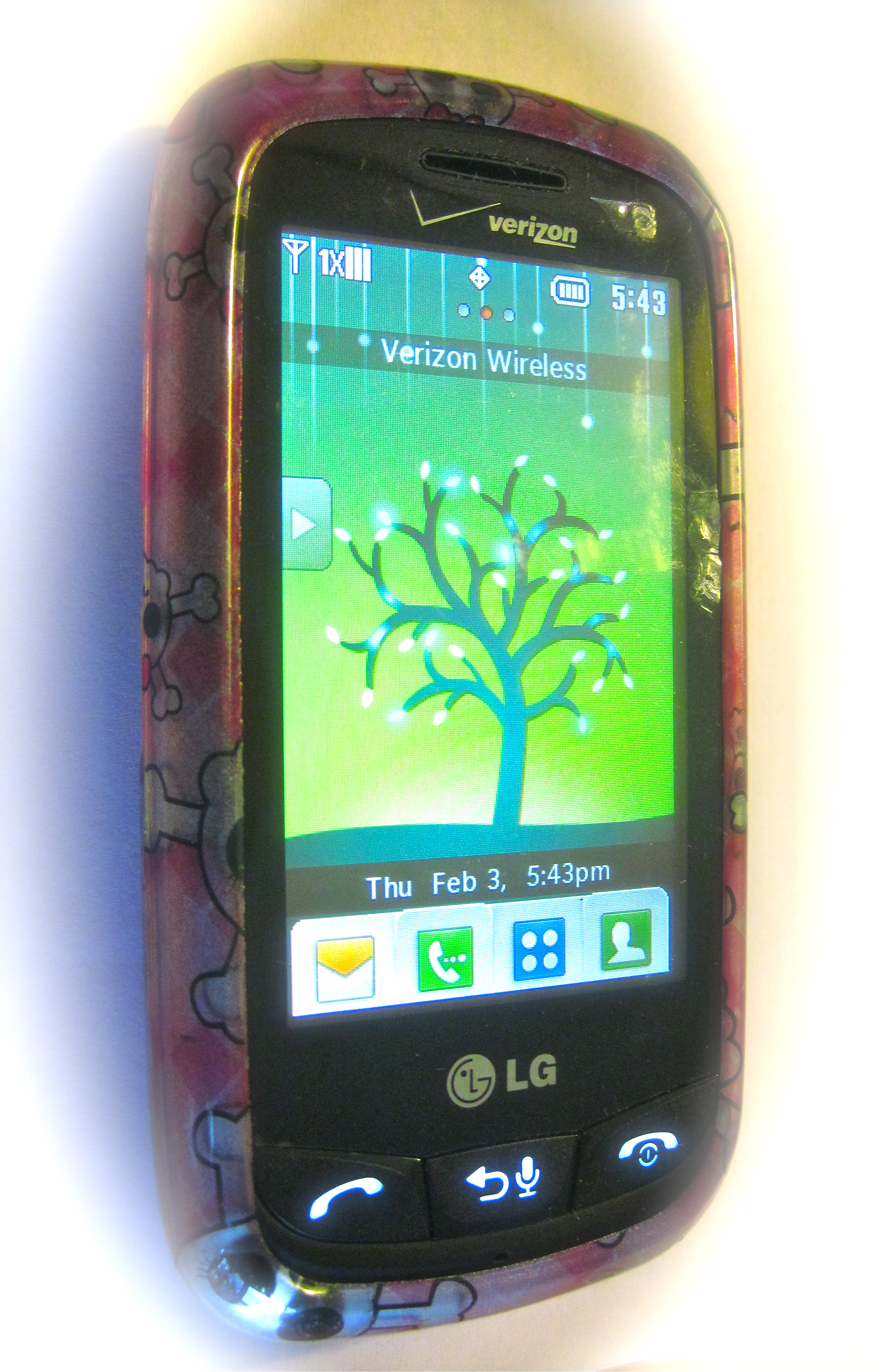
- Manufacturer: LG Electronics
- Predecessor: LG Cosmos
- Successor: LG Extravert
- Compatible networks: CDMA
- Form factor: Slider
- Dimensions: 4.05" (H) x 2.08" (W) x 0.65" (D)
- Weight: 4.37 oz (124 g)
- Removable storage: Supports up to 16 GB of external memory
- Battery: Usage time: up to 360 minutes Standby time: up to 480 hours
- Rear camera: 1.3 Megapixels with no video camera
- External display: 2.80" screen 400x240 Color TFT display Supports up to 262K colors
- Development status: Discontinued (Available as a Certified Pre-Used Device)

The LG Cosmos (LG VN250) is a slider mobile phone made by LG Electronics. The phone is available in both a touch screen and non-touch screen model. It became available on Verizon Wireless in Q1 2010, and was replaced by LG Cosmos 2 in July 2011. The phone has 1.3-megapixel camera, VZ Navigator, Voicemail, Media Center, QWERTY keyboard and SMS and MMS messaging.

== Hardware ==
The devices' front side has a keypad for dialing and sending SMS. The phone's dimensions are 112mm (H) x 52mm (W) x 17mm (D) (4.41" (H) x 2.05" (W) x 0.67" (D)), with a weight of 125g (4.4 oz).

The Cosmos has a 2 inch, 240x320-pixel, 262K-color QVGA TFT LCD screen. It supports Bluetooth and low speed CDMA2000 1xRTT data, but not 802.11 networking.

The phone features a sliding 4-row QWERTY keyboard, front numeric dial pad with navigation d-pad. Input support for a single microSD/TransFlash/microSDHC memory card slot is present (support for up to 32 GB cards), and the phone also sports a microUSB (USB 2.0) data port for charging and data transfer. Phone memory is limited to 19 MB. The Cosmos contains a full duplex speakerphone with external volume controls.

It communicates over 1.9 GHz CDMA PCS, 800 MHz CDMA (Digital Dual–Band). The phone is M3/T4 rated for hearing aid compliance, and supports digital TTY/TTD for the hearing impaired.

== Software ==
The Cosmos's OS (Operating System) is almost the same as the Env2, Env3 and the LG VX5500. It also has a Media Center for game downloads. No music player software is included with the Cosmos, however mp3s can be played through the My Sounds section of tunes and tones.

=== Phonebook ===
The phonebook is limited to 1000 contacts and has a dedicated ICE contact section. Each contact can store:

- 5 phone numbers (2 mobile, 1 home, 1 business, 1 fax)
- 2 email addresses (1 personal and 1 business)
- 1 physical address (street, city, state, zipcode, country)
- 1 IM screen name
- 1 associated picture ID (for pictures stored within the phone)
- 1 associated ringtone (for ringtones stored within the phone)
- 1 group association
- a notes section (30 characters only).

=== Speed dial ===
Speed dial on the Cosmos is limited to 999 entries (not including 1 as the voicemail default).

=== Bluetooth ===
The Cosmos contains Bluetooth version 2.1 (with A2DP and EDR support). Current versions of the phone OS support up to 20 Bluetooth pairings, however the software does not support Bluetooth OBEX profiles. Calendar events and contacts can be transferred via Bluetooth to a computer, and pictures stored on the phone can be printed via Bluetooth directly to a printer.

=== Camera and photo ===
The 1.3-megapixel camera uses default resolution of 1280x960 and supports 640x480 and 320x240. Its 2x digital zoom is not supported at the default 1280x960 pixel resolution. The camera software supports night mode, white balance and several visual effects. It has no video capture capability. Photo manipulation software allows zoom, rotate, and crop as well as noise reduction. Direct upload of photos to Facebook and other online album services is supported.

=== Browser support ===
The Cosmos relies on Infraware's Polaris 6.1 browser. The browser supports HTML, CSS, ECMA Script, AJAX, RSS and Java.

=== Messaging ===
Cosmos supports text and picture messaging. Messages are threaded by default, although this feature can be disabled.

This Phone has 2 Ways of Messaging:

1. Regular Keypad Messaging

2. QWERTY Keypad Messaging (Slide Up)

== Online contact sync ==
The LG Cosmos can integrate with Verizon's Backup Assistant to update and manage contacts. It can wirelessly sync the address book in the phone with the address book online in Backup Assistant (manually or automatically).

Each contact entry in Backup Assistant can contain information that is not sent to the phone (e.g. birthdays, middle names, etc.). Extra information stored online in Backup Assistant is not transferred to the phone. Certain information on the phone is not stored in Backup Assistant, including Groups/Category, Ringer, SMS Ringer, Picture ID, Secret, Speed Dial, Primary Phone and Voice Dial.

This information may be removed from the entry in the phone during sync. If an entry marked as ICE undergoes significant changes, the ICE status may be removed from the entry upon sync.

== See also ==
- List of LG mobile phones
