= Sparah =

- Client: Virgin Mobile USA
- Title: Sparah
- Product: Mobile devices; Mobile data packages
- Release date(s): 2011

Sparah is the name of Virgin Mobile USA's summer 2011 marketing campaign. Its name is the combined names of Spencer Falls and Sarah Carroll, two complete strangers chosen from obscurity to be manufactured into a celebrity couple for the company's marketing campaign. The two were introduced in a series of commercials, print ads, and a web series.

Since the launch of the campaign, Sparah has received significant media attention, having appeared on pop culture websites and magazines.
