= Helio Ocean =

Mobile phone

Helio Ocean PN-810
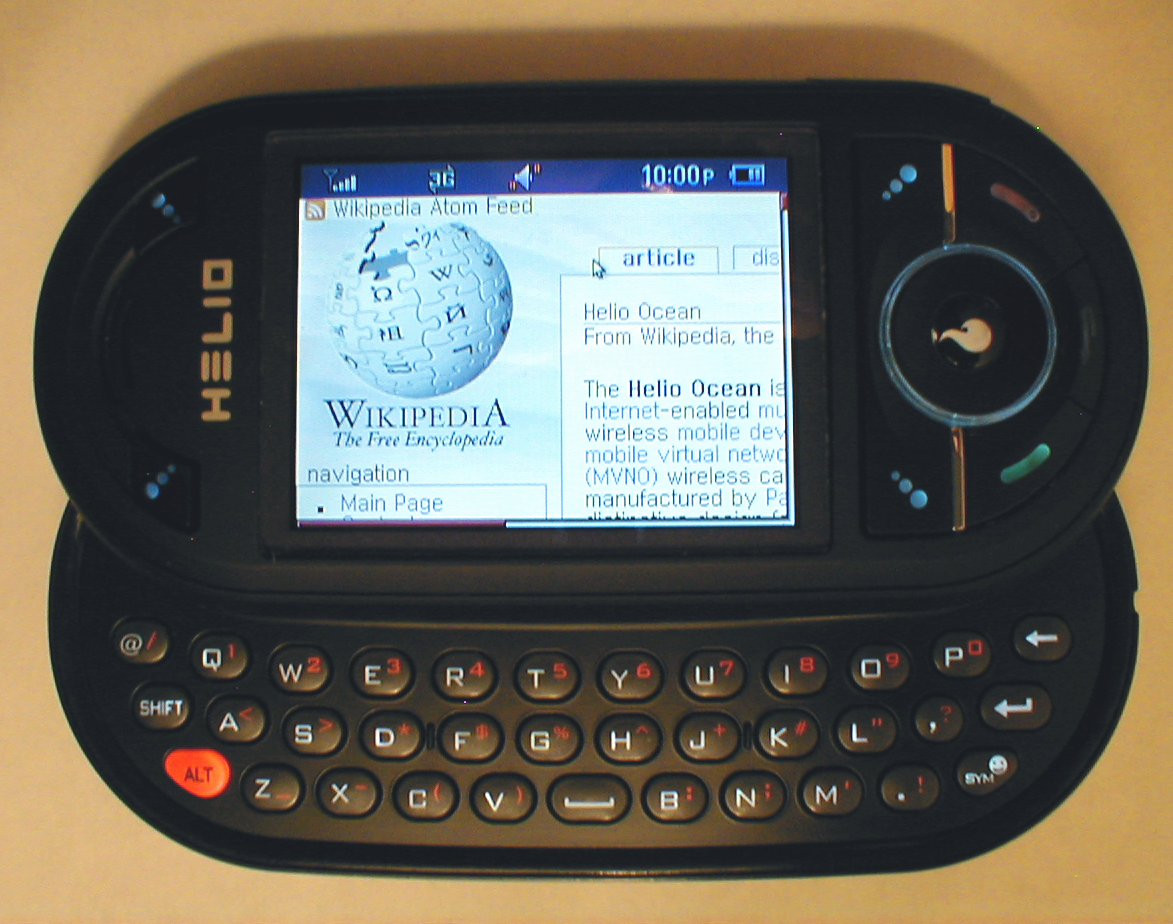
- Compatible networks: CDMA 1x EV-DO 800/1900 MHz
- Dimensions: 4.33" (H) x 2.20" (W) x 0.86" (D)
- Weight: 5.61 oz (159 g)
- Memory: 200 MB + up to 2 GB extra memory available via microSD; SDHC is not compatible
- Display: 2.4" QVGA display, 262K color TFT-LAC, 240 x 320 resolution
- Connectivity: USB, Bluetooth

The Helio Ocean was a dual slider Internet-enabled multimedia wireless mobile device sold by mobile virtual network operator (MVNO) wireless carrier Helio, and manufactured by Pantech Curitel. A distinctive design feature of the Ocean was its dual sliding mechanism — when slid down in the vertical position, it revealed a telephone keypad. When slid down in the horizontal position, it revealed a 35-key QWERTY keyboard.

Since their acquisition by Sprint Nextel, Virgin Mobile USA terminated the wireless voice and data services of those customers who had an Helio Ocean or other Helio branded devices on May 25, 2010. Customers had until this date to transfer their wireless phone number to another wireless carrier without loss of service. A deactivated Helio Ocean can still be used as a digital camera, allowing images and video files to be downloaded via the included USB interface cable directly to a computer.

The HELIO, Helio Mobile and OCEAN trademarks were acquired by Helio Inc in June 2025.

== Release ==
The device became first known to the public on November 24, 2006 from an FCC filing. Photos released on December 9, 2006 showed the Ocean in test apparatus documentation, and later on February 21, 2007 a full gallery depicting the Helio Ocean was available through the FCC website.

When publicly released on Friday, May 11, 2007, the Ocean was billed as "the ultimate messaging and talking machine" and "the definitive mobile social networking experience." The Ocean is seen as a breakthrough device for Helio, appealing to a more mainstream audience and not just the "ultra-cool hipsters" the company had previously targeted. Dr. Wonhee Sull, President & CEO of Helio, said that work on the Ocean device started "before Helio was officially a company."

== Features ==
The Ocean was a prime example of a converged device. In addition, to telephony functions, the Ocean's functions included those of a camera phone and a portable media player. The Ocean device had several advanced features, such as stereo Bluetooth, a 2 megapixel camera with flash, an MPEG-4 video camera, 3G speed EV-DO network support, built-in GPS, MMS support, and a removable battery.

The Helio Ocean had a considerable number of features at the time of its release. Standard programs included a Web browser, a calculator, an alarm clock and a calendar. For communication, the device included caller ID (with support for photo caller ID), a speaker phone, a voice memo recorder, a record call feature, address book (with multiple online syncing abilities), T9 Text, and Korean character set support.

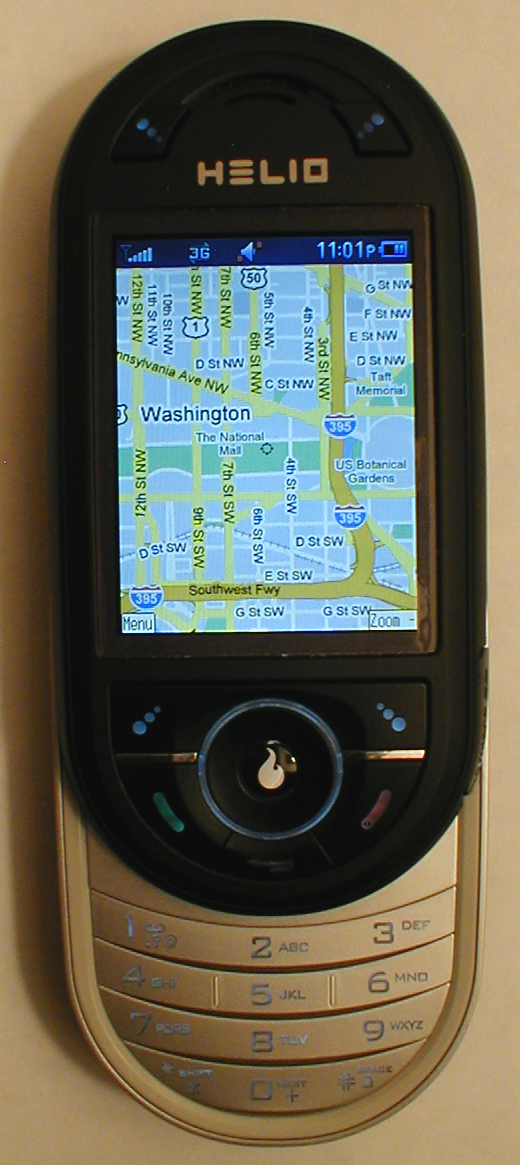
Helio Ocean running Google Maps in portrait mode.

=== GPS ===
The device was location aware with its internal GPS. The Ocean was loaded with a version of Google Maps, which displayed turn-by-turn directions; however, the application warned users that it should not be used while driving. Additionally, the Buddy Beacon application allowed friends with Buddy Beacon-enabled phones (as of Dec 2008, only Helio phones) to broadcast their current location to each other, visible via MapQuest.

=== Multimedia ===
The integrated music and video player supported multiple file formats (including MP3, MPEG-4, H.264, AAC, and WMA) and allowed for over-the-air (OTA) downloads. The music player ran on a separate microprocessor, with improved efficiency that allowed for an estimated 15 hours of music listening on a battery charge. On November 29, 2007 Helio released a file viewer program for Ocean users, allowing the device to read a variety of popular file formats, among them DOC, XLS, PPT, PDF, HTML, TXT, as well as several image types in both landscape and portrait modes.

== Ultimate Inbox ==
The Helio Ocean also included several choices of E-mail communication with support for Helio Mail, Yahoo! Mail, Windows Live Hotmail, AOL Mail, Gmail, EarthLink, and two additional user-defined POP or IMAP accounts. Helio began adding support for push e-mail to the Helio Ocean in July 2007 with Push support for Yahoo! Mail, Windows Live Hotmail, and AOL Mail. On April 23, 2008 push support was added for Gmail, along with automatic notifications for POP/IMAP accounts. For a nominal fee per month, connectivity to Microsoft Exchange was available on the Ocean since July 25, 2007. There is also instant messaging support for AOL Instant Messenger, Yahoo! Messenger, and Windows Live Messenger.

=== Locations Mini ===
On August 2, 2007, those in the Helio community had figured out how to build custom applications (the device is Java-based), including Opera Mini. Several months later, on March 19, 2008, the Ocean got official software support for the Opera Mini browser when Helio became the first U.S. carrier to sign a deal with Opera. It was speculated that Helio had followed the "incredible community response to Opera Mini."

=== MySpace Mobile ===
MySpace Mobile was available for the Helio Ocean, leading some to refer to the Ocean as a "MySpace phone". Helio was the first cellular provider to take the MySpace experience mobile. On July 19, 2007 Helio announced the launch of an improved version of Myspace Mobile that operated nearly five times faster than Helio's original self-developed application.

=== YouTube ===
On December 12, 2007 Helio announced a more enriched YouTube experience, at the time the "most complete" on a mobile device. The Ocean was able to perform video capture and upload to YouTube, as well as GPS tagging of videos. Users could log into YouTube to personalize, rate videos and use other community features.

== Popular culture ==
In early episodes of the reality television show Keeping Up with the Kardashians, Kris Jenner is seen using the device.

== See also ==
- Helio
- Danger Hiptop (T-Mobile Sidekick)
- LG enV (VX9900)
- LG Voyager (VX10000)
- GPS Phone
