= LG enV3 (VX9200) =

Mobile phone

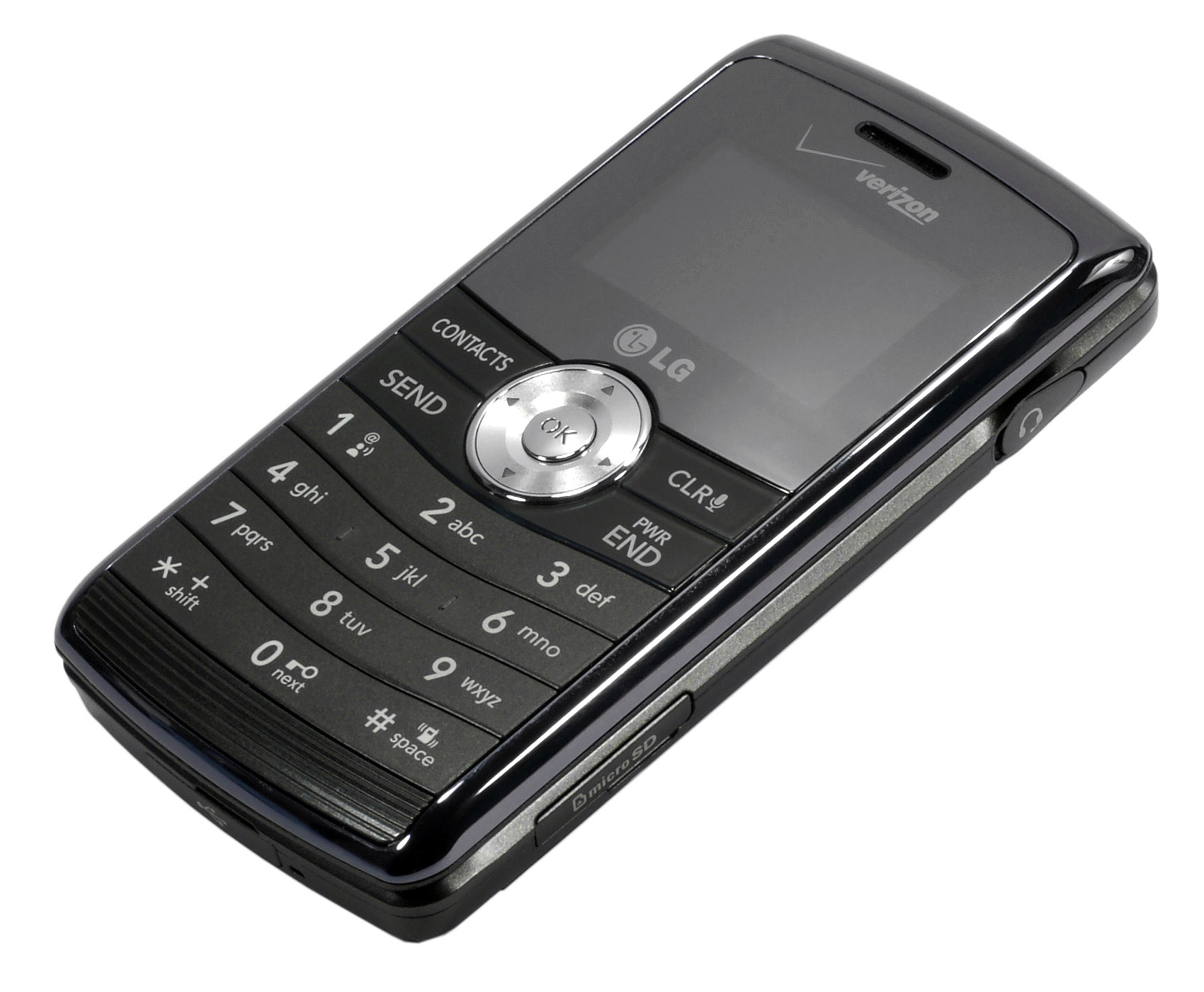
- Front view of a slate blue colored enV3
- Manufacturer: LG Electronics
- Series: LG enV
- Availability by region: June 2009
- Discontinued: 2010; 16 years ago
- Predecessor: LG enV2
- Successor: LG Octane
- Related: LG The V; LG enV Touch; LG Chocolate Touch
- Compatible networks: CDMA2000; 1xEV-DO
- Form factor: Flip
- Dimensions: 4.11×2.13×0.65 in (104×54×17 mm)
- Weight: 3.77 oz (107 g)
- Operating system: Proprietary
- Memory: Internal memory
- Removable storage: Up to 8 GB microSD card slot (card not included)
- Battery: 950 mAh
- Rear camera: 3.0 MP
- Front camera: none
- Display: 2.6 inch TFT LCD
- External display: 1.6 inch CSTN
- Connectivity: USB
- Data inputs: Front: keypad; Full: QWERTY
- Development status: Discontinued (as of early 2010)
- Hearing aid compatibility: M4
- Other: Colors: maroon, blue

The LG enV3 is a mobile phone built by LG Electronics, and released from Verizon Wireless in the United States and Telus Mobility in Canada (as the Keybo 2). It succeeded the LG enV2. Along with a slimmer design, the enV3 also boasts a full keyboard, a 2.6-inch screen and a 3.0-megapixel camera. In addition to standard phone and text messaging capabilities, the enV3 can be used as a portable music player as well as Internet capabilities such as e-mail and web browsing. The phone is Bluetooth enabled.

== Design ==
The enV3 phone has a slimmer design than the previous version. It has a circular D-pad on the front, a number keypad, and a slightly larger external display than the enV2. Along with the number keypad, there is a dedicated Contacts button, a Clear button and the Send and End/Power keys. Once it's opened, the enV3 has a larger 2.6-inch main display and a full QWERTY keyboard. There is a Favorites button for accessing the set favorite contacts and a dedicated text messaging button, which opens a blank text message. The navigation array on the right of the keyboard consists of the typical Send and End/Power keys, a four-way square toggle, a middle OK key, a Clear key, and a dedicated speakerphone key. On the left side of the phone is the camera button and volume adjuster. On the right side, there is a microSD memory card slot and a 2.5mm headset jack. The charger jack is on the bottom of the phone and the camera lens is on the back, as is an LED flash.

It comes in two colors - slate blue and maroon.

== Features ==
The enV3 features a number of improvements over previous versions of the phone. It has a 1,000-entry phone book with room in each entry for five numbers, two e-mail addresses and a street address. Other features include voice command and dialing functionality, calendar, alarm clock, world clock, notepad, mobile instant messenger (AIM, Windows Live Messenger, and Yahoo), tip calculator, and Bluetooth. The phone also features the ability to add a social network e-mail address in the "Blogs" section of the Messaging menu, allowing photos or videos to be uploaded directly to Facebook or MySpace.

Advanced users can also use the phone as a large USB mass storage device, GPS with VZ Navigator support, e-mail reader and visual voice mail player. There's also a Dashboard with Mobile Web; an Internet portal which enables access to Internet channels and information sources such as ESPN, weather channels, entertainment and news. The Dashboard also contains a shortcut to a full web browser.

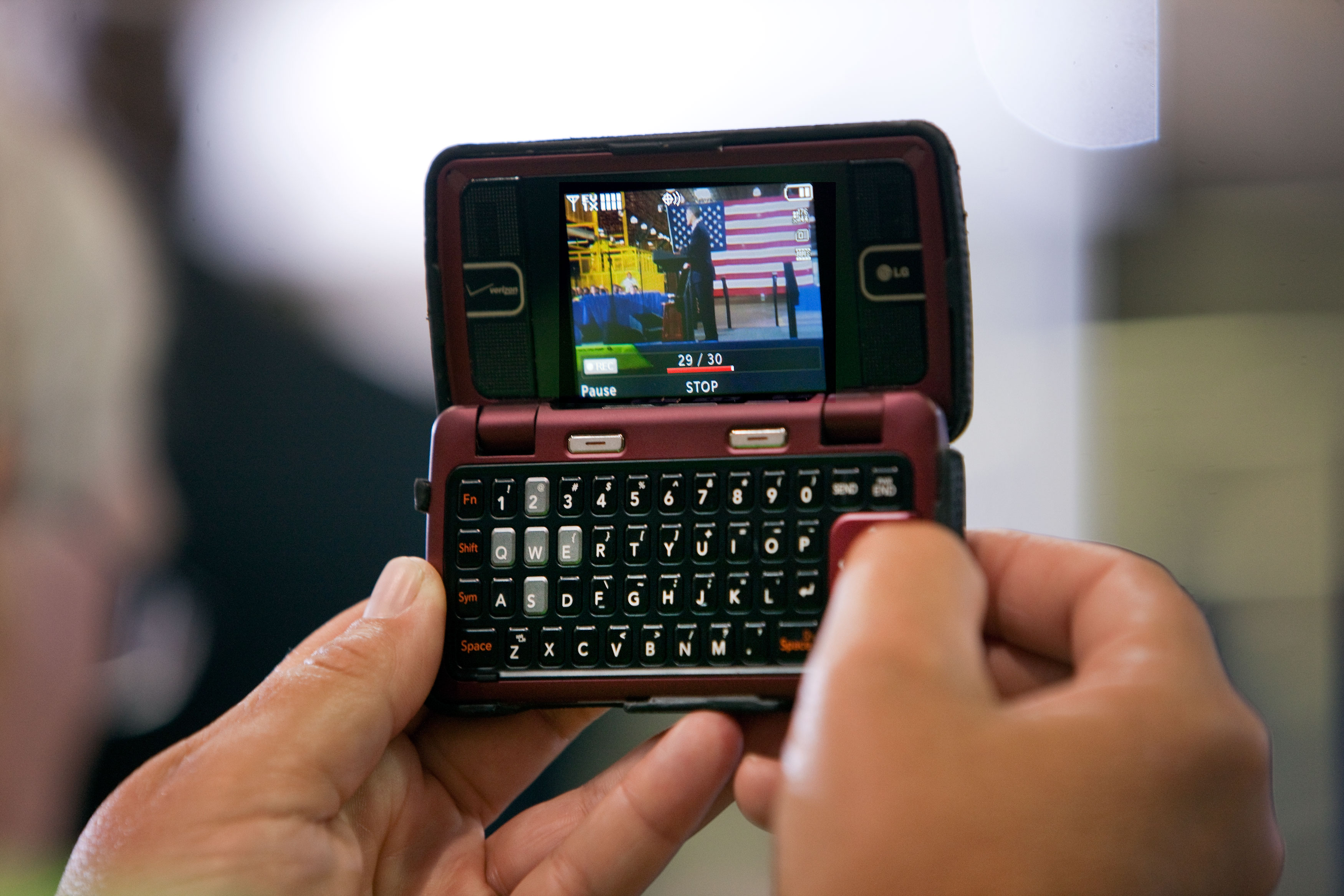
An enV3 taking a photo of United States President Barack Obama in 2009

The enV3's camera is a 3.0-megapixel camera which allows the user to take pictures in six different resolutions, five white balance presets and with five different color effects. There are also four special shot modes: Smile shot, which automatically takes a picture when a person smiles; Panorama, which stitches together three photos shot from left to right; Intelligent shot, which automatically adjusts the white balance and color saturation based on the environment; and Dual Display mode, which activates the external display, allowing self-portraits.

The env3 provides access to a wide range of music services, such as V Cast Music, where the user can download songs over the air; the V Cast Music with Rhapsody service, where songs can be purchased and downloaded directly to the phone for $1.99. It can also play non-protected music files from an SD memory card, and store music files transferred from a computer using a USB cable. The enV3 also has the capacity to use Verizon's Song ID, which can "listen" to a sample of a song and return the title and artist.

== Defects in early versions ==
The enV3 has caused a lot of problems with many of its users. There have been complaints of the phone turning off at random throughout the day, and some users have also complained that the software used to compose and send text messages is difficult to use. Even though the firmware of the phone has been updated several times, some problems persist. This could be because of a battery or hardware design flaw. When texting using the front screen the user can only type 160 characters, and the predictive text dictionary does not remember words as you type them.

== Available accessories ==
Accessories endorsed by Verizon Wireless include Bluetooth headsets and headphones, microSD cards and adapters, as well as certain brands of speakers. There are also a number of different cases, which come in multitudes of different colors and patterns. Covers and screen protectors are also widely popular.
