= LG The V (VX9800) =

Mobile phone

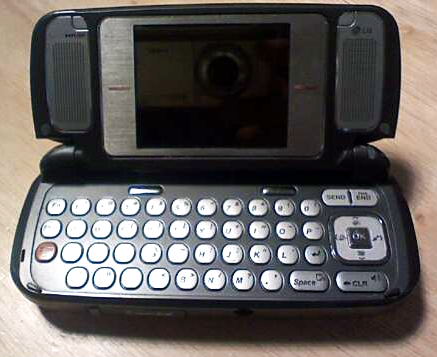
- Manufacturer: LG Electronics
- Availability by region: 2005
- Successor: enV (VX9900)
- Compatible networks: CDMA
- Form factor: Flip
- Dimensions: 4.57×1.97×1 in (116×50×25 mm)
- Weight: 5.19 oz (147 g)
- Operating system: BREW
- Memory: 128 MB (built-in, flash shared)
- Removable storage: Mini SD
- Battery: 1300 mAh (standard)
- Rear camera: 1.3 Megapixel
- Display: 320 x 256 px LCD (18 bit color)
- External display: 160 x 128 px LCD (65,000 colors)
- Connectivity: Bluetooth, USB Cable
- Data inputs: Keyboard, Numpad

The V (LG VX9800) is a CDMA smartphone. It was released under Verizon Wireless in 2005.

Since then, it has been replaced by the enV (VX9900), enV2 (VX9100) and enV3 (VX9200), which are much slimmer and maintain most of the features of The V, while adding a 2.0-megapixel camera and stereo Bluetooth support.
