= Helio Kickflip =

VK Mobile V650C a.k.a. The Kickflip
- Compatible networks: CDMA 1xEV-DO 800/1900 MHz
- Dimensions: 9.9×5×2.5 cm (3.88×1.96×0.98 in)
- Weight: 127 g (4.47 oz)
- Memory: 70 MB + extra memory available via microSD
- Display: 5.6 cm (2.2") QVGA, 262K color TFT-LCD, 240 x 320 resolution
- Connectivity: 1xEV-DO, HSDPA, HSUPA, USB

The Kickflip, produced by VK Mobile, was one of Helio's two launch devices and was marketed heavily to MySpace users. The Kickflip is a swiveling cell phone, white in color and with a flat (screen-only) front. Some of the features included 2-megapixel camera, 90 minutes of video recording, side buttons, QVGA screen, and 8 day stand by/3 hour talk time battery life. Reviewers at PC Magazine and Infosync lauded the phones design aspects, but noted the lack of Bluetooth capabilities and a wide range of bugs in the phone applications which affected the basic functionality of the phone.
