= Kajeet =

Cell Service Carrier (founded 2003.)

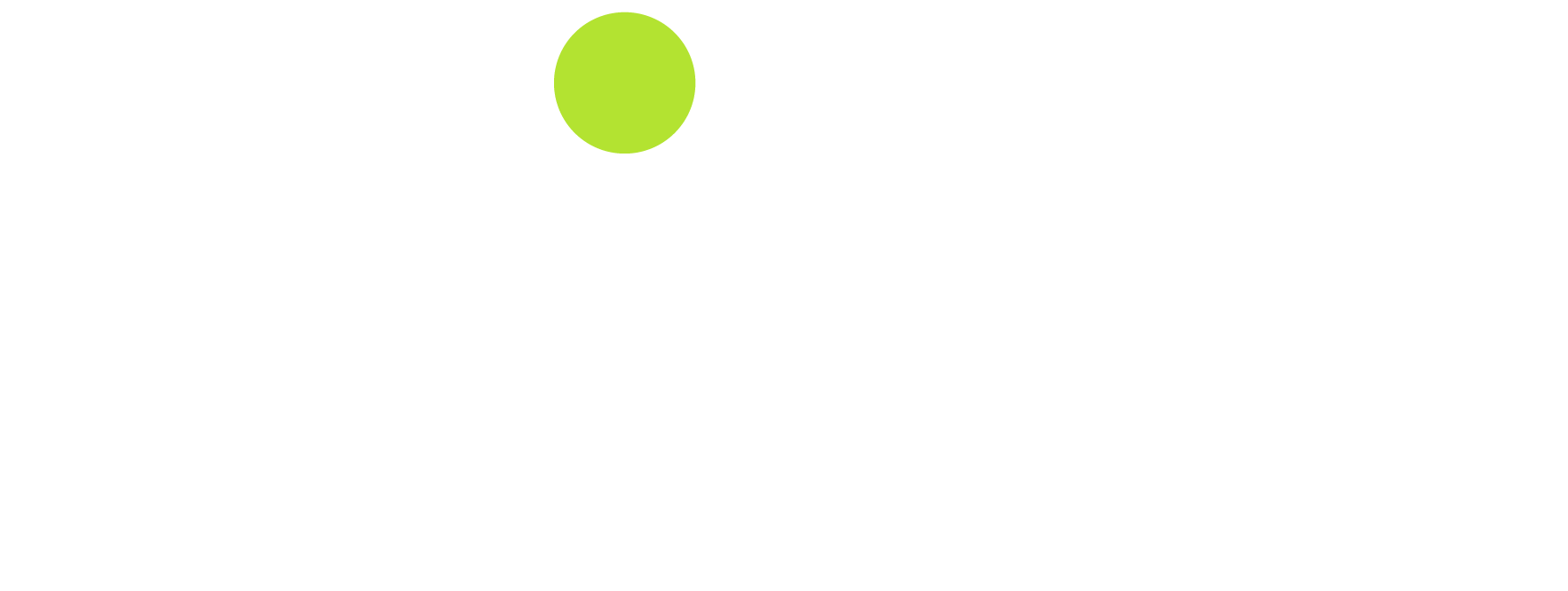
- Type: Private
- Industry: Wireless Services
- Founded: 2004
- Headquarters: McLean, VA, United States (Corporate headquarters)
- Key people: Rob Adams, Chairman, Daniel Neal, Vice Chairman of the Board & Founder, Ben Weintraub, CEO & Founder
- Products: Wireless communication using CDMA
- Website: http://www.kajeet.com/

Kajeet is a mobile network operator that delivers internet access to a variety of industries across North America and globally in 24 other countries. Kajeet Inc. provides Iot of connectivity, software, hardware products and services to businesses, schools, hospitals, government agencies, and telecommunications enterprises. Its headquarters are located in McLean, Virginia and operations are located in Phoenix, Arizona, with regional offices in 11 cities in the United States.

== Background ==
Kajeet was founded in the 2003 by three fathers who wanted to figure out how to use mobile technology to provide a safe mobile experience for kids. The company name, "Kajeet", was derived as an anagram from the names of the founder's children. Two of the original founders still guide the company today: Ben Weintraub, COO, and Daniel Neal, CEO. Kajeet's original service provided safety-conscious families with affordable cell phones and prepaid plans for their teens, and young children. More recently Kajeet has implemented its patented mobile management technology to provide off-campus mobile connectivity service to school districts.

In 2007, Kajeet was mentioned in a Time Magazine online article and in the print edition. In both, the author Wendy Cole recounted her daughter's experience during Kajeet beta testing.

== Education Broadband ==
Kajeet began offering off-campus mobile broadband service to schools and districts in 2012 and Education Broadband service in 2014. According to multiple sources, on average, one-third of U.S. students do not have adequate Internet access when they leave school. As more and more districts and schools incorporate technology into their curriculum and prepare for state-mandated testing (1-to-1, BYOD, Blended Learning), students are required to work on assignments outside the classroom. A large number of disadvantaged students are finding themselves caught in a widening “digital divide” struggling to keep up with their more affluent peers. According to the Kajeet website, the company provides a “safe, affordable, mobile broadband solution called Education Broadband™ that connects economically disadvantaged students to the Internet outside of school.” The Education Broadband solution, includes a portable Kajeet SmartSpot® and patented filtering and controls that enables school districts to provide CIPA-compliant, education-only filtered Internet access to keep students focused on school work without worry of data abuse.

== History ==
- On March 19, 2007, Kajeet launched a presence in Whyville, the virtual world for kids, sponsoring a "Chat Factory" in the Whyville Mall. In May 2007, the kajeet-Whyville relationship was presented as a case study in online marketing to kids at the Kid Power 2007 conference in Orlando, Florida.
- In mid-March 2007, Kajeet officially announced its retail launch in Best Buy and Limited Too stores, and in April began selling in Long's Drugs stores on the west coast.
- In early April 2007, Kajeet began running its first television commercial on Nickelodeon, Cartoon Network and other kid-specific broadcast outlets.
- On May 16, 2007, Kajeet was featured in "Marketing Cell Phones to Kids," part of a five-part CBS News report on marketing to kids.
- In June 2007, Kajeet launched "Dudemail", an e-mail application featuring customizable versions of the six animated characters that includes a text-to-speech component. The company was also singled out by Best Buy in their 2007 Corporate Responsibility Report.
- By October 2007, Kajeet had secured phone and refill card distribution not only in Best Buy, Limited Too and Longs Drugs, but also in Target, Toys R Us, Wal-Mart, Amazon CVS and Rite Aid locations. The company moved quickly in the wake of Disney Mobile's announcement that it was shutting down in December 2007 by offering a $50 service credit to Disney Mobile users who switch their number to the Kajeet service.
- Kajeet was named one of five companies to watch by The National Venture Capital Association, a trade association that represents the U.S. venture capital industry, in its 2005–2006 Year in Review. In September 2007, kajeet announced the securing of $36.8 million in series-B venture capital funding.
- In May 2009, MTV Networks filed an $11.6 million lawsuit against Kajeet, accusing it of using content without permission and failing to follow through on a ring-tone licensing deal.
- In August 2010, Kajeet won nearly $81 million in damages over student-loan auction rate securities UBS financial Services sold to the company.
- In September 2013, Kajeet began offering off-campus, CIPA-compliant mobile Internet connectivity to school districts who, in turn, provide the service to their economically disadvantaged students.
- In July 2014, Kajeet launched “Education Broadband™” service to help solve the issue of “the digital divide” and made it available to more than 13,000 school districts.
- In January 2016, direct sales of all Kajeet phones were discontinued.
- In July 2017, Kajeet announced that it would be shutting down and discontinuing its cell phone service on 8/23/2017 to focus on education and to help kids to succeed in school.
- In August 2021, Kajeet acquired Red Rover LTD
- In October 2024, Kajeet announced a new investment from MWP Growth Capital
