= LG enV Touch =

2009 mobile phone by LG Electronics

LG enV Touch (VX11000)
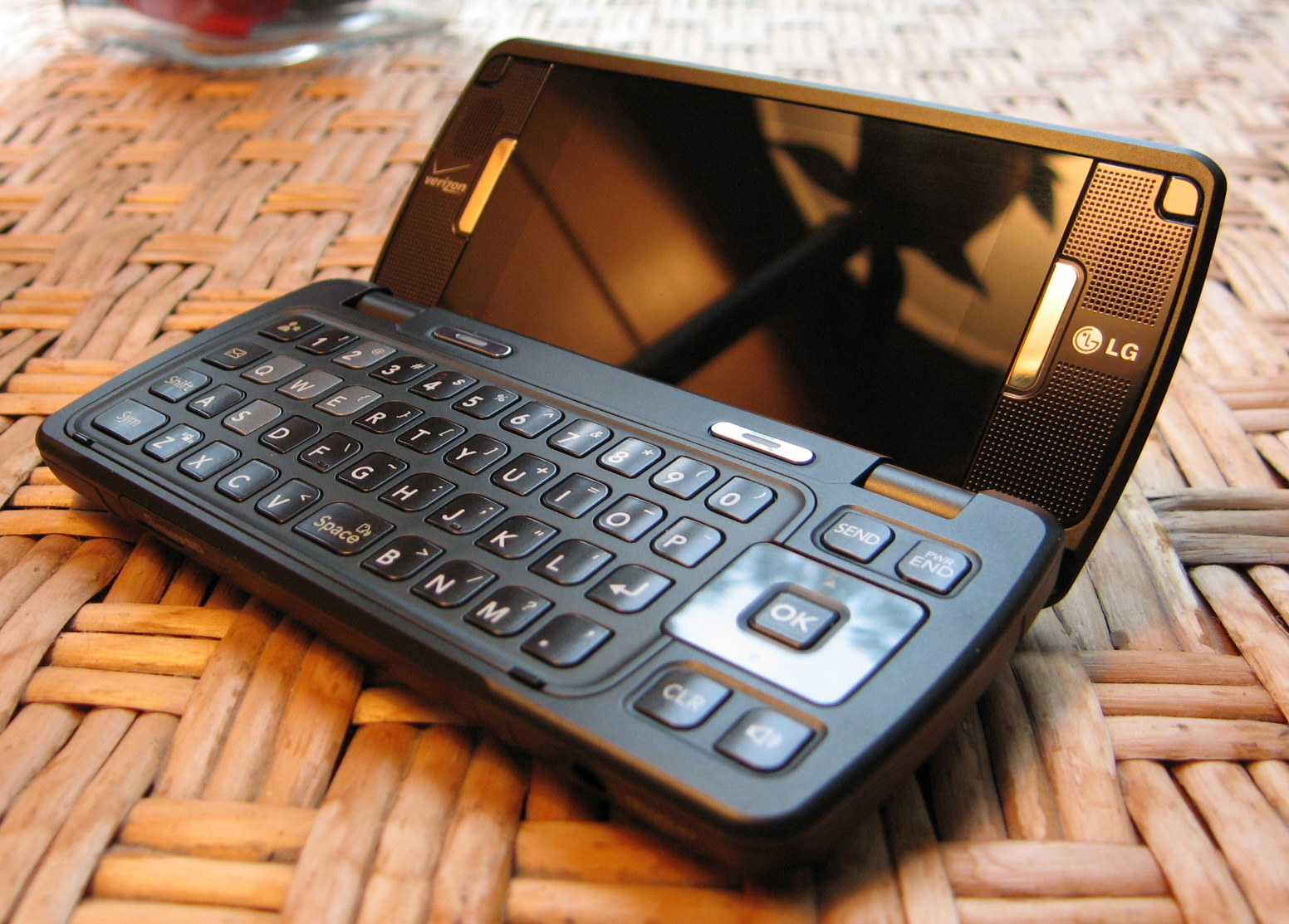
- Manufacturer: LG Electronics
- Availability by region: June 5, 2009
- Predecessor: LG Voyager (VX10000)
- Successor: LG Genesis
- Compatible networks: EVDO, 1X, 3G connection
- Form factor: Clamshell (Candybar/flip)
- Dimensions: 4.52 x 2.16 x 0.66 inches (115 x 55 x 17 mm)
- Weight: 140g (4.92 oz)
- Operating system: BREW
- Memory: 250 MB
- Removable storage: up to 16 GB (microSD)
- Battery: 950 mAh
- Rear camera: 3.2-megapixel
- Display: LCD 800 x 480
- External display: LCD 800 x 480
- Sound: Stereo, VCast Video/Music, VZ Navigator, Visual Voicemail (VX10KV09 and above Only)
- Hearing aid compatibility: M4/T4

The LG enV Touch, also known as the Voyager 2 or VX11000, is an internet-enabled, multimedia device created by LG Electronics for use with Verizon Wireless. The phone was released on June 5, 2009 as a successor to the LG Voyager. The phone's external screen is touch enabled with a virtual keyboard and buttons. The internal screen features a QWERTY keyboard and both screens have a WVGA resolution. The phone's functions include a 3.2-megapixel camera with flash, a portable media player, text messaging, e-mail support, a web browser, a built-in accelerometer, and Verizon's GPS navigation software, VZ Navigator. It is a dual-band CDMA phone using EVDO for data communications.

== Features ==
The enV Touch has a larger external touch screen and internal screen display than its predecessor, the Voyager, as well as a camera with a newer 3.2-megapixel image sensor, an LED flash, and stronger vibration. The QWERTY keyboard retained a similar size to the original Voyager's but its layout was altered slightly to move the space key to the middle of the keyboard, unlike previous enV devices which had the key on the both sides of the layout.

The enV Touch includes text messaging and web browsing capabilities, as well as camera and video recording, voice commands, and speaker phone. The phone supports Verizon's VCast Video/Music, Visual Voicemail, and VZ Navigator services. However, the phone lacks the VCast Mobile T.V. support of the original Voyager. It features accelerometer motion sensors which can be used to play certain games available to the device. The enV Touch also features a Document Viewer that can display Microsoft Excel, PowerPoint, and Word documents, as well as PDF documents. The most recent software revision is version 11, which includes the polaris Browser, and also new animations.
