= LG Voyager =

Smartphone

LG Voyager (VX10000)
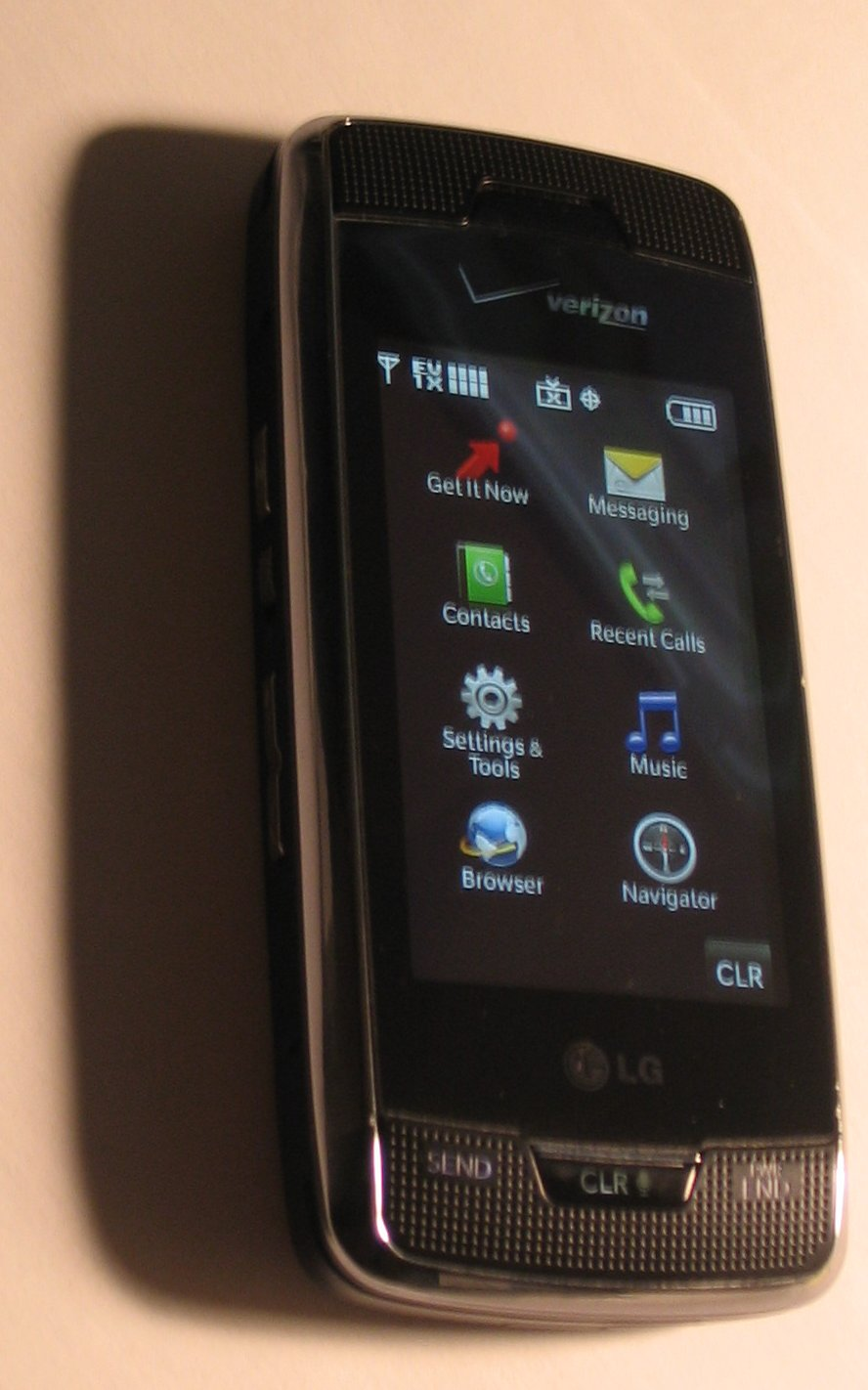
- Manufacturers: LG Electronics Telus, Bell Mobility, Reliance
- Availability by region: November 21, 2007
- Predecessor: LG enV (VX9900)
- Successor: LG enV Touch (VX11000)
- Compatible networks: EVDO, 1X
- Form factor: Clamshell (Candybar/flip)
- Dimensions: 4.64 in (H) x 2.12 in (W) x 0.71 in (D)
- Weight: 133g (4.69 oz)
- Operating system: BREW
- Memory: 182 MB
- Removable storage: 8 GB (microSD)
- Battery: 950 mAh
- Rear camera: 2.0-megapixel
- Display: LCD 400 x 240
- External display: LCD 240 x 400
- Connectivity: Bluetooth / USB Cable

The LG VX10000, also known as the Verizon Voyager or LG VX10K, is an Internet-enabled multimedia smartphone designed by LG Electronics and carried by Verizon Wireless in the US, Telus and Bell Mobility in Canada, and Reliance in Asia. The external screen is touch enabled with a virtual keyboard and buttons. It features an internal screen for use with the included full QWERTY keyboard. Both screens of the Voyager have WQVGA resolution. The Voyager's functions include those of a camera phone and a portable media player, in addition to text messaging, and Internet services including e-mail and web browsing. It is a dual-band mobile phone that uses the CDMA standard. It supports the EVDO data technology.

The Voyager's online release date in the United States was November 18, 2007, and it was released into stores on November 21, 2007, costing US $299 with a two-year contract, though it was subsequently lowered to $200, $150, $130, $100, and finally $80. The rapid price drop was due to stiff competition, notably the Apple iPhone 3G, which went on sale July 2008 and started at $199. The Voyager then dropped to its lowest price of $79.99 after a $50 mail-in rebate. As of second quarter 2008, the LG Voyager had sold 1.3 million devices. On June 5, 2009, the LG enV touch was released for Verizon for $150.00.

== Features ==
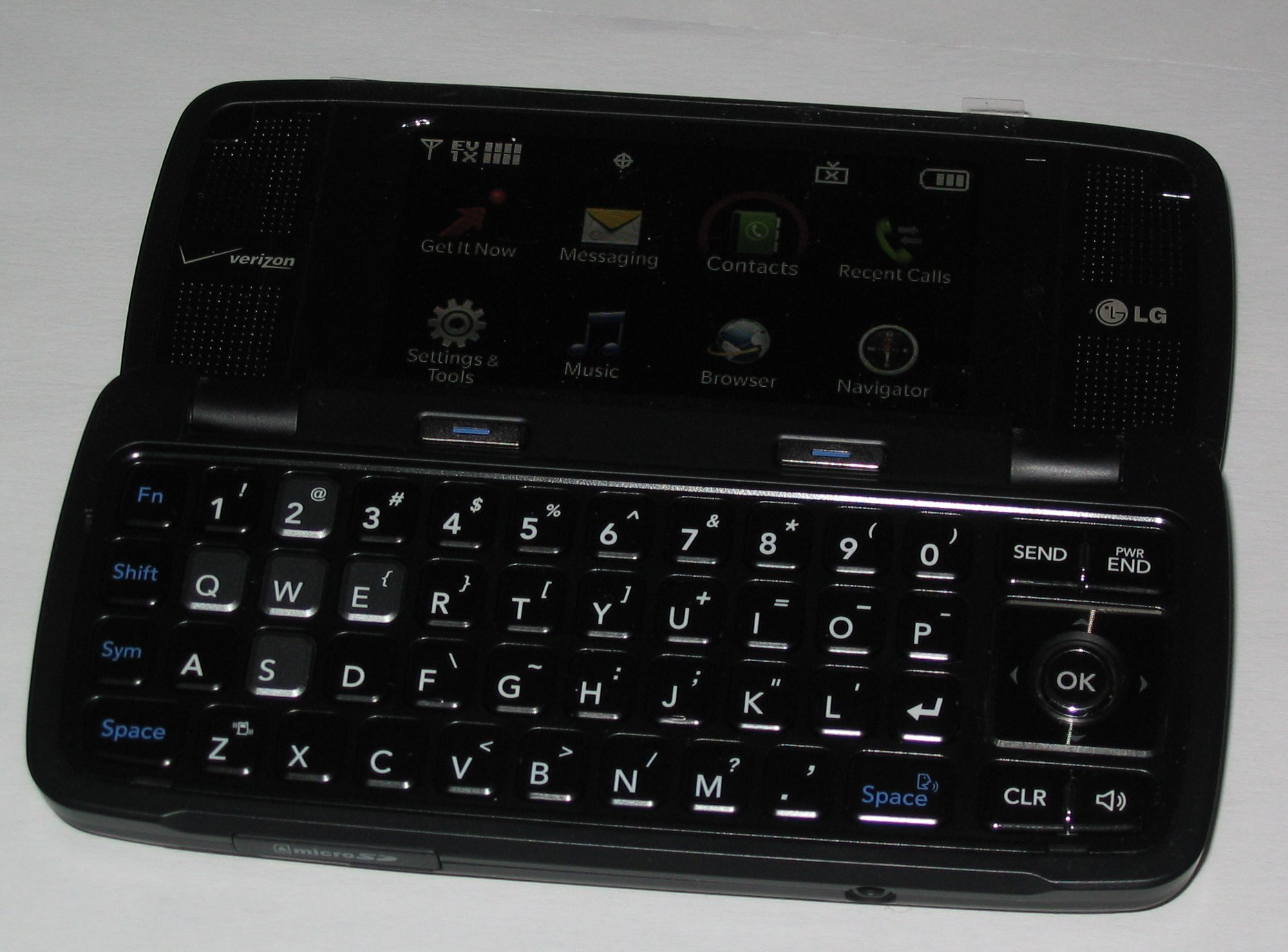
The Voyager in its open state, revealing the internal screen and QWERTY keyboard.

Packaged in a lateral-clamshell design that hides a QWERTY keyboard, the Voyager provides a web browser, the ability to access Verizon's V CAST service (which provides TV, video, and music downloads) and the ability to play MP3, Windows Media, and unprotected AAC files. The Voyager utilizes Verizon Wireless' EVDO broadband network for data transfer.

The Voyager has a 2.0-megapixel digital camera and camcorder, an external microSDHC slot for up to 8 GB of external storage, a USB connector, and stereo Bluetooth capability. The phone's battery is removable, and can be replaced with an extended battery to increase talk and standby time. The Voyager features an external touch screen, similar to that of the Prada, which features a mechanism to simulate the haptic feedback of physical buttons when the screen is touched.

The phone has a 7.14 cm (2.81") display screen with a 240 x 400 pixel resolution screen. The 950 mAh Lithium-Ion Polymer battery allows up to 240 minutes of talk time or 480 hours of standby time.

== Titanium Voyager ==
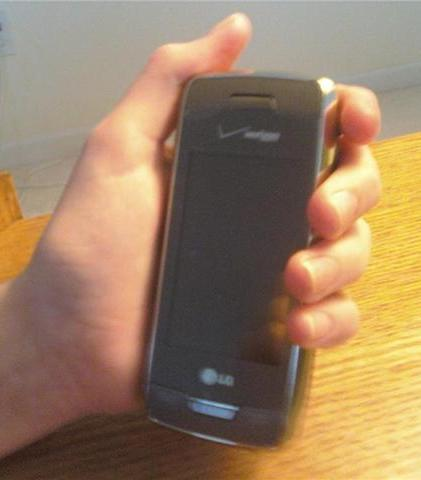
The Titanium Voyager

On June 17, 2008, Verizon announced that it would be implementing Visual Voicemail on several yet-to-be released phones, including one known simply by the name "Voyager" but with a new color option of titanium which is a silver-gray color. The Refresh was a major firmware update, though this was not at that time confirmed by a Verizon representative.

Several days later, users on internet message boards reported references on Verizon Wireless's website to a phone called the VX10000 Silver, leading people to believe that a silver version of the phone would also be made available (Now known as the Voyager Titanium).

On August 9, Verizon Wireless released the "Voyager Refresh" V09 update to all Verizon stores. The entire core operating system has been upgraded to match the newer LG Dare. Rhapsody music support was added and some technical problems fixed. The interface became more responsive, with a consolidated Media Center, which later phones used replacing the older Get it Now interface.

Most significant however, was the long-rumored addition of Visual Voicemail to the LG Voyager. However, despite past reports, the use of the service was not free. The download of Visual Voicemail application to the Voyager remains free, but a fee of $2.99 per month must be added in order to use it.

The LG Titanium Voyager, is a moderately-sized phone, that can be used for voice calls, texting, email, Global Positioning System (GPS) and mobile TV almost instantly via MediaFLO (which is an extra $15 per month with or without the Verizon Wireless "VPak"). A data plan for V-Cast enabled phones without VPak charges for any data are $1.99 per MB. The camera can record videos up to 30 seconds to be sent in an MMS, or the setting can be altered to record videos up to the limit of available memory, which cannot be sent through messaging via the phone.

The Voyager has been subsequently removed from Verizon stores and online store and replaced by the LG enV touch. The enV Touch is frequently referred to as the Voyager 2, due to the cancellation of the LG Voyager.
