= Virgin Mobile USA =

Former American mobile network provider

- Type: Subsidiary
- Industry: Wireless communications; Entertainment
- Founded: October 18, 2001; 25 years ago San Francisco, California, United States
- Founder: Richard Branson; John Tantum
- Defunct: January 2020; 6 years ago
- Fate: Merged with Boost Mobile on February 2, 2020
- Successor: Boost Mobile
- Headquarters: Kansas City, Missouri, United States
- Number of locations: 40,000 (handset retail partners); 150,000 (Top-Up card retailers)
- Area served: Contiguous United States; Hawaii; Puerto Rico
- Key people: Dow Draper, CEO, Virgin Mobile USA
- Products: Wireless plan, Mobile phones
- Services: Inner Circle plan
- Number of employees: 500 (2009)
- Parent: Sprint Corporation
- Subsidiaries: Helio (defunct); Virgin Mobile USA, L.P. (defunct)
- Website: virginmobileusa.com (archived)

Virgin Mobile USA was a no-contract Mobile Virtual Network Operator. It used Sprint's network for coverage. It licensed the Virgin Mobile brand from United Kingdom-based Virgin Group. Virgin Mobile USA was headquartered in Kansas City, Missouri, and provided service to approximately 6 million customers.

Founded in 2001 as a joint venture between Virgin Group and Sprint Corporation, Virgin Mobile USA commenced operations in June 2002 as a mobile virtual network operator (MVNO), providing services via the Sprint 1900 MHz CDMA network. In 2009, Sprint Nextel bought out joint-venture partner Virgin Group, becoming the sole owner of Virgin Mobile USA.

In June 2017, Virgin Mobile dropped all Android and began to only offer iPhones to new customers under its new "Inner Circle" unlimited plan. Following the discontinuation of the plan in 2018, it began to restore Android devices to its lineup.

In January 2020, Virgin Mobile announced that it would shut down, and transfer its remaining customers to Boost Mobile the following month in preparation for the Sprint and T-Mobile merger.

== History ==
=== Foundation ===
Virgin Mobile USA was formed in 2000 in San Francisco. In July 2000, John Tantum and Dave Whetstone pitched Richard Branson on entering the U.S. market after Virgin had successfully launched Virgin Mobile in the United Kingdom in 1999. At that point, the U.S. team began pitching the U.S. mobile operators on the concept of an MVNO, which at the time was not well understood. The MVNO concept Virgin Mobile was pitching to mobile operators was a joint venture, where both parties would have aligned incentives, rather than the often-contentious relationship that mobile operators had with resellers. A joint venture was created between Virgin Group and Sprint Corporation, and Dan Schulman was brought in to run the business. Virgin Mobile USA began operating in the summer of 2002. Because prepaid mobile had a downmarket perception at the time, Virgin Mobile USA called its service "pay as you go."

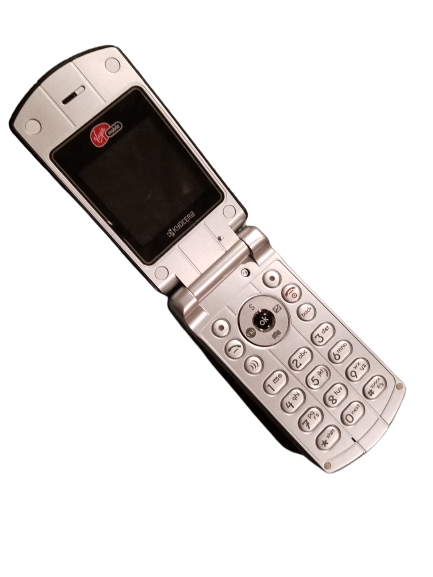
A Kyocera Marbl, one of Virgin Mobile USA's first phones

=== Initial public offering ===
In May 2007, Virgin Mobile USA, Inc. initiated an initial public offering (IPO) by filing with the United States Securities and Exchange Commission. On October 10, 2007, Virgin Mobile's sold 27.5 million shares at US$15 per share, at the low end of the original $15–$17 prediction.

On November 15, 2007, approximately one month after the IPO, Virgin Mobile USA announced earnings for the three-month period ended September 30, 2007. The company reported that its third-quarter loss widened to $7.3 million, compared with a loss of $5.1 million in the year-ago quarter. The company also reported a pro-forma loss of 15¢ per share, compared with a loss of 10¢ per share in the year-ago period. As of November 16, 2007, shares of the company's common stock had declined to $9.19 per share.

The company reported in 2007 that it held an exclusive license for the Virgin Mobile brand in the United States, U.S. Virgin Islands and Puerto Rico until the end of 2027. In exchange, Virgin Mobile USA agreed to pay 0.25% of gross revenues up to an annual limit of $4 million, adjusted annually for inflation.

=== Acquisition of Helio ===
In 2008, Virgin Mobile USA acquired Helio, Inc., a competing mobile virtual network operator (MVNO) also hosted on the Sprint network, aimed at post-paid, contract users. By late 2009, Virgin Mobile USA ceased selling new Helio phones or service, dropping the Helio name.

=== Full acquisition by Sprint Nextel ===
On July 28, 2009, Sprint Nextel Corporation agreed to acquire the outstanding shares of Virgin Mobile USA, Inc. in return for Sprint Nextel stock valued at approximately US$5.50 per share of Virgin Mobile USA common stock. Prior to the purchase, Sprint Nextel owned 13.1% of Virgin Mobile USA.

After the acquisition, Sprint Nextel formed the Sprint Prepaid Group, an organizational division which included Sprint's other prepaid offerings, Boost Mobile and Common Cents Mobile.

=== Initial smartphones and Beyond Talk plans introduction ===
In May 2010, Virgin Mobile USA began offering its first smartphone, the BlackBerry Curve 8530, combined with new, unlimited text and data Beyond Talk-branded plans.

=== Discontinuation of Helio ===
Sprint Nextel announced in March 2010 that Virgin Mobile USA would stop providing service to Helio post-paid customers on May 25, 2010. Sprint Nextel offered Helio customers incentives to switch to Sprint-branded service plans.

=== Integration of Common Cents Mobile ===
On May 18, 2011, Sprint Nextel discontinued operating its Common Cents Mobile pre-paid brand. Common Cents Mobile customers were transitioned to a Virgin Mobile USA payLo service plan that allowed the former Common Cents Mobile customers to keep their existing $.07 per minute rate.

=== Initial 4G devices ===
On May 31, 2012, Virgin Mobile USA began offering 4G products and services using Sprint's 2500 MHz 4G WiMAX network. The HTC EVO V 4G, which was also previously released by Sprint as the HTC EVO 3D was the first 4G smartphone.

On February 25, 2013, Virgin Mobile USA released the Samsung Galaxy Victory 4G LTE, its first 4G device using Sprint's 4G LTE network. On June 28, 2013, Virgin Mobile USA released the Apple iPhone 5, its second device taking advantage of Sprint's LTE network. On April 1, 2014, Virgin Mobile USA released the NETGEAR Mingle mobile hotspot, its first tri-band device which is capable of using all three of Sprint's LTE bands.

=== Inner Circle, transition to iPhone only ===
In June 2017, Virgin Mobile USA announced a new promotional offer known as "Inner Circle", offering an "unlimited" data plan (subject to throttling of media streaming quality, and full throttling of data after 23 GB of usage) for $50 per-month, and that new customers would receive a year of service for $1, and another six-month period for $1 if they purchase a new device after their second year of service. At the same time, the carrier transitioned to only offering iPhone products to new customers, and dropped all other devices from its smartphone lineup.

The Inner Circle plan was discontinued in August 2018; the carrier then started to return Android devices to its lineup, citing consumer demand.

=== Discontinuation ===
In mid-2018 Virgin Mobile was pulled out of Target stores. Shortly thereafter a majority of the Virgin Mobile workforce was laid off. In April 2019 the brand was pulled out of Best Buy and in May, Meijer. In October 2019, Virgin Mobile was pulled from Walmart leaving the company without a national retail presence. In January 2020, the company began notifying its customers by text message that it was discontinuing service and that in February 2020 customer accounts would be migrated to Boost Mobile.

== Services ==
Virgin Mobile USA offered wireless products and services through Virgin Mobile.

=== Virgin Mobile ===
Virgin Mobile-branded service was available within the contiguous United States, Hawaii and Puerto Rico coverage areas under the Sprint nationwide network.

=== Assurance Wireless ===
Virgin Mobile offered Assurance Wireless, the telephone service subsidized by the federal Lifeline Assistance program, a government benefit program supported by the federal Universal Service Fund. The Assurance Wireless brand was moved to the T-Mobile family in 2020 after the Sprint and T-Mobile merger was officially completed and after Virgin Mobile was officially shut down and folded into Boost Mobile.

== Network ==
=== Coverage ===
Virgin Mobile USA provided wireless services in the contiguous United States, Hawaii, and Puerto Rico via parent, Sprint's nationwide CDMA, EVDO, LTE, and Sprint Spark networks.

=== Phone support ===
Since June 27, 2017, Virgin Mobile USA sold the iPhone in various models. Options included:

- iPhone 6
- iPhone 6S
- iPhone 6S Plus
- iPhone SE (1st generation)
- iPhone 7
- iPhone 7 Plus
- iPhone 8
- iPhone 8 Plus
- iPhone X

Customers who already owned an iPhone were able to bring it to Virgin Mobile USA if it was compatible. From February 2018, grandfathered customers without the iPhone-only Inner Circle plan remained eligible to purchase Android devices, feature phones and mobile broadband modems.

== Services ==
Inner Circle Virgin Mobile USA has one plan offering for new customers. The iPhone-only Inner Circle plan offers customers unlimited talk, text and data for $50. However, when users purchase an iPhone or bring their own iPhone and port their number to Virgin Mobile, the first 6 months of service are $1 per month. The Inner Circle plan also promotes "perks" that customers have exclusive access to as Inner Circle members. These "perks" include a companion ticket on Virgin Atlantic, an extra night at Virgin Hotels and discounts from Virgin Wines.

Data Love and Data Love+ Virgin Mobile USA maintains the Data Love and Data Love+ plans for customers who were already using these services before June 21, 2017.

=== Member benefits ===
Customers on the Inner Circle plan are eligible for member benefits. The concept is the same as Virgin Mobile Canada's program of the same name, which was first introduced in 2010, and competitor T-Mobile Tuesdays, which was introduced in 2016. Most member benefits differ between the American and Canadian versions, though the programs do share some partners and deals in common, including H&M and Virgin Hotels.

=== Former services ===
Virgin Mobile USA offered older services that are now discontinued. Customers with such services may be entitled to a grandfather clause.

Broadband2Go Internet plans were offered with Virgin Mobile USA's mobile broadband modems. Users could purchase access to Broadband2Go services by the day or by the month. A daily plan offered 250 MB of full-speed access. Monthly plans ranged from 500 MB to 6 GB. access.

PayLo plans offered users unlimited talk and text for $40 per month.

Virgin Mobile offered talk, text, and mobile web access plans for feature phones and smartphones under the Data Done Right brand. These plans could only be purchased at Walmart.

== Account security ==
In September, 2012, media outlets began reporting on the findings of Kevin Burke, a software developer and Virgin Mobile USA customer. Burke's experimentation led him to claim that Virgin Mobile USA's account security practices did not adequately protect customer account information.

To access their account via the Virgin Mobile USA website, customers must enter their ten-digit telephone number and a six-digit password. The maximum possible number of six-digit passwords is one million, a relatively small number. According to Burke, Virgin Mobile USA did not employ security techniques that would prevent an attacker from rapidly cycling through all possible password permutations, allowing a brute force attack to succeed in twelve days or less.

In response to the wide media coverage, Virgin Mobile updated its online account access system, limiting users to 20 attempts from one IP address.

== Marketing ==
Virgin Mobile's target audience was primarily young adults, and the company often utilized edgy, pop culture content when advertising. On March 15, 2010, Lady Gaga released the music video for Telephone which included product placement for a Virgin Mobile branded LG Rumor.

Beginning on May 2, 2011, Virgin Mobile USA launched a campaign that revolved around a fictional Hollywood celebrity couple "Sparah". The campaign was expected to last six months, but ran through the end of 2011. Virgin Mobile produced multiple videos and photo galleries that starred the fictional couple and posted them to a dedicated website "sparah.com." Virgin Mobile USA hoped to connect the ability for consumers to enjoy data-intensive web content using a Virgin Mobile USA unlimited data plan.

In August 2011, Virgin Mobile USA aired television ads that parodied elements of T-Mobile USA and AT&T Mobility's marketing, featuring an unflattering portrayal of spokespersons for both brands.

In March 2012, Virgin Mobile introduced an ad campaign featuring Richard Branson, founder of Virgin Group, and the slogan "We answer to a higher calling".

== Retail presence ==
Virgin Mobile products and services were sold via the virginmobileusa.com web site and at partner retail outlets, including Best Buy, RadioShack, Target, Fred Meyer, and Walmart.

== See also ==
- Virgin Mobile
- Virgin Mobile FreeFest
- Sprint Corporation
- Boost Mobile
