= LG UX =

User interface developed by LG Electronics

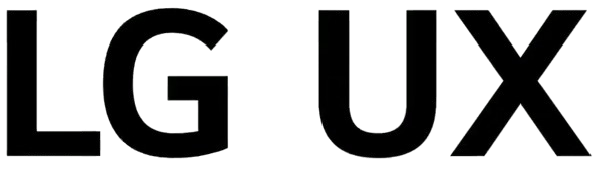
- Developer: LG Electronics
- OS family: Android-like OS (Android-based Linux OS)
- Working state: Discontinued
- Source model: Open source (Modified Android Base and Main Framework) with Proprietary components (LG Apps)
- Initial release: LG UX 1.0 (Android 4.0)
- Latest release: LG UX 10.0 (Android 13) / August 2023
- Marketing target: Alternative OS replacement for Android devices; Stock firmware for LG smartphone and tablet
- Package manager: APK-based
- Supported platforms: ARMv7, ARM64
- Kernel type: Monolithic (modified Linux kernel)
- License: Proprietary
- Preceded by: Optimus UI

Support status
- Unsupported as of June 30, 2025

LG UX is an Android-based mobile operating system developed and maintained by LG Electronics independently of Google exclusively for its smartphones.

There are different versions for each LG phone, and each version has variants according to the regions in which the phone is sold, such as China, Japan, Pakistan, Russia, Indonesia, India, Taiwan and Turkey.

The original name of LG UX is Optimus UI, and was given the current name with the launch of the LG G Flex 2 and the release of LG UX 4.0, with older versions retroactively renamed LG UX.

== Version history ==
Version	Android version	Date of release	Notable change	Ref.
LG UX 1.0 (Optimus UI 3.0)	4.0 - 4.1	May 16, 2012	Added Quick Memo; Added QSlide	
LG UX 2.0 (Optimus UI 4.0)	4.2 - 4.4	September 2013	Added KnockON; Added KnockCode	
LG UX 3.0 (Optimus UI 5.0)	4.4 - 5.1.1	May 2014	Added Gesture Shot; Added Touch & Shoot	
LG UX 4.0	5.0 - 6.0.1	April 8, 2015	Added Camera Manual Mode; Added Smart Notice to provide more personalized notifications; Simplified the design of the user interface	
LG UX 4.0+	5.1.1 - 6.0.1	October 8, 2015		
LG UX 5.0	6.0 - 6.0.1	March 28, 2016	Added LG Friends Manager; Enhanced support for LG G5's camera features; Redesigned user interface	
LG UX 5.0+	7.0	September 6, 2016	Supports LG V20's display; Added LG Health app; Added Smart Doctor manager; Added new audio recording tools	
LG UX 6.0	7.0 - 7.1.2	February 26, 2017	Customized to take maximum advantage of LG G6's display; Added Square Camera feature; Added Food Mode	
LG UX 6.0+	7.1 - 8.1.0	August 14, 2017	Optimized to work with LG V30's display; Added new camera app powered by Graphy; Added Floating Bar; Upgraded always-on display	
LG UX 7.0	8.0.0 - 9	May 2018		
LG UX 8.0	9	Unknown		
LG UX 9.0	9 - 11	November 29, 2019		
LG UX 9.0 V50S UI	9 - 11	Unknown		
LG UX 9.0 Velvet UI	10 - 11	Unknown		
LG UX 9.0 Wing UI	10 - 11	Unknown		
LG UX 10.0	11 - 13	Unknown		

== Devices running LG UX ==
=== High-end Phones ===
- LG Wing
- LG Rollable

==== G Series ====
- LG Optimus G
- LG Optimus G Pro
- LG G2
- LG G Flex
- LG G Pro 2
- LG G3
- LG G3 Stylus
- LG G Flex 2
- LG G4
- LG G4 Beat
- LG G4 Stylus
- LG G Vista
- LG G Vista 2
- LG G5
- LG G5 SE
- LG G6
- LG G6+
- LG G7 ThinQ
- LG G8 ThinQ
- LG G8S ThinQ
- LG G8X ThinQ
- LG Velvet
- LG Velvet 2 Pro

==== V Series ====
- LG V10
- LG V20
- LG V30
- LG V30+
- LG V30 Signature Edition
- LG V35 ThinQ
- LG V40 ThinQ
- LG V50 ThinQ
- LG V50S ThinQ 5G
- LG V60 ThinQ

=== Mid to Low-end Phones ===
==== K Series ====
- LG K8 (2018)
- LG K10 (2018)
- LG K11 (2018)
- LG K30 (2018)
- LG K3 (2017)
- LG K4 (2017)
- LG K8 (2017)
- LG K7(2017)
- LG K10 (2017)
- LG K20 Plus
- LG K3
- LG K4
- LG K5
- LG K7
- LG K8
- LG K10
- LG K22
- LG K31
- LG K41s
- LG K41
- LG K42
- LG K51
- LG K52
- LG K61
- LG K62
- LG K71
- LG K92

==== Q Series ====
- LG Q6
- LG Q7
- LG Q8 2017
- LG Q8 2018
- LG Q Stylus
- LG Q Stylo 4
- LG Q9
- LG Q60
- LG Q70
- LG Q31
- LG Q51
- LG Q61
- LG Q52
- LG Q92 5G

==== X Series ====
- LG X Screen
- LG X Cam
- LG X Charge
- LG X Style
- LG X Power
- LG X Power 2
- LG X Mach
- LG X Max
- LG X5
- LG X Skin
- LG X Venture

==== W Series ====
- LG W10

==== Stylus (Stylo) Series ====
- LG G Stylo
- LG Stylus 2
- LG Stylus 2 Plus
- LG Stylus 3
- LG Stylus 3 Plus
- LG Stylus 4
- LG Q Stylo
- LG Stylo 5
- LG Stylo 6

==== Other Series ====
- LG Magna
- LG Bello 2
- LG Zero
- LG Ray

=== Tablets ===
- LG G Pad X
- LG G Pad III 8.0
- LG G Pad III 10.1
- LG G Pad IV 8.0
- LG G Pad 5 10.1
