= LG Wing =

2020 Android phablet manufactured by LG Electronics

LG Wing 5G
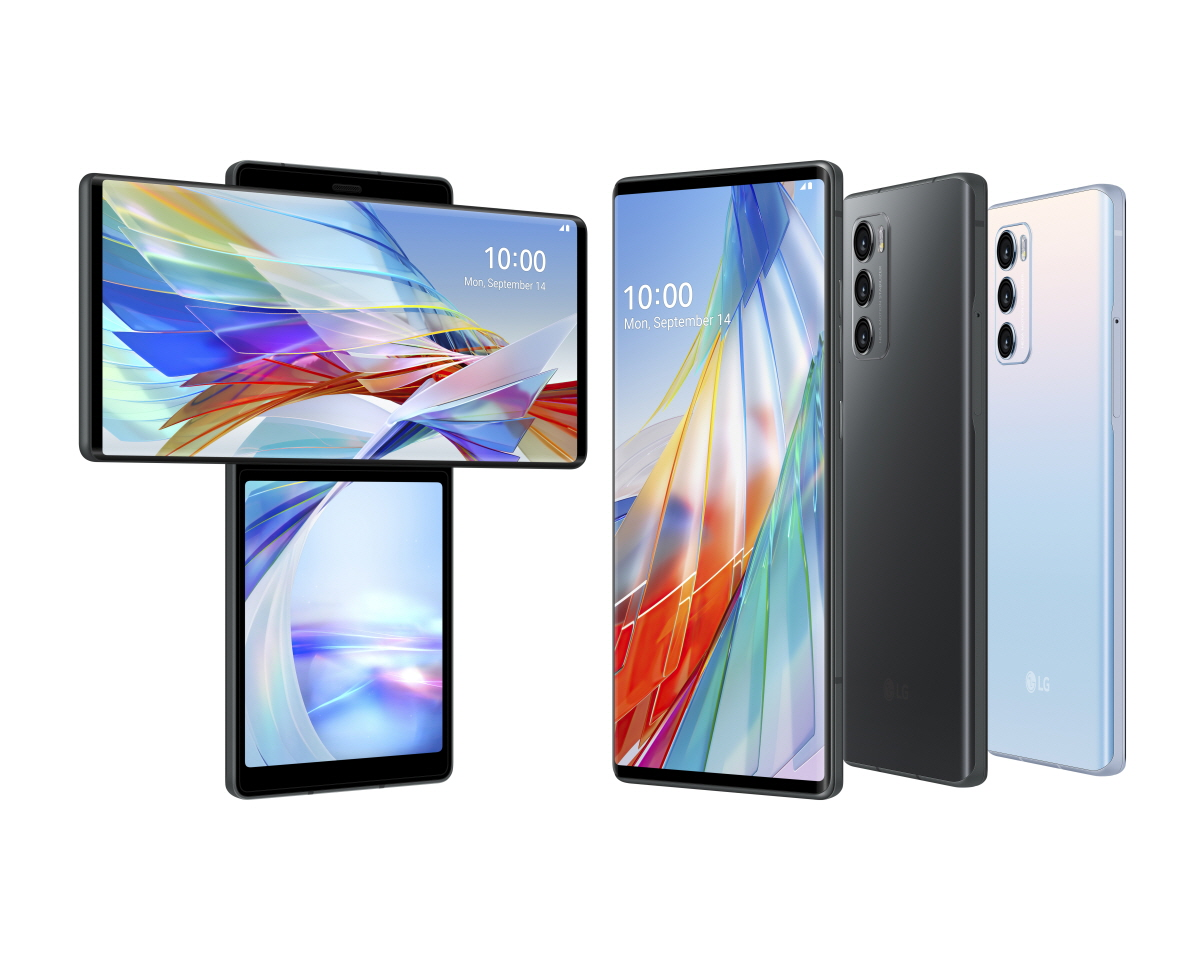
- Brand: LG Electronics
- Manufacturer: LG Electronics
- Type: Phablet
- First released: October 15, 2020; 5 years ago
- Discontinued: April 5, 2021; 5 years ago
- Related: LG Velvet; LG V60 ThinQ
- Compatible networks: 2G GSM/GPRS/EDGE – 850, 900, 1800, 1900 MHz; 2G CDMA 1xRTT – 800, 1900 MHz; 3G UMTS/HSDPA/HSUPA/HSPA+ – 850, 900, AWS (1700), 1900, 2000, 2100 MHz; 4G LTE; 5G SA/NSA/Sub6
- Form factor: Swivel; Slate
- Dimensions: 169.5 mm (6.67 in) H 74.5 mm (2.93 in) W 10.9 mm (0.43 in) D
- Weight: 260 g (9.2 oz)
- Operating system: Original: Android 10 Upgradable to: Android 13
- System-on-chip: Qualcomm Snapdragon 765G
- CPU: Octa-core (1x 2.4 GHz Prime, 1x 2.2 GHz Gold, 6x 1.8 GHz Silver) Kryo 475
- GPU: Adreno 620
- Memory: 8 GB RAM
- Storage: 128 or 256 GB UFS
- Removable storage: microSDXC, expandable up to 1 TB
- Battery: Li-Po 4000 mAh
- Rear camera: 64 MP (wide), 25mm, f/1.8, 1/1.72", 0.8 μm; 13 MP (ultrawide), f/1.9, 1.0 μm, 117˚; 12 MP (ultrawide), f/2.2, 1.4 μm, 120˚; PDAF, OIS, gyro-EIS, HDR, 4K@60 fps, 1080p@30/60 fps
- Front camera: 32 MP, f/1.9, 26mm, 1/2.8", 0.8 μm HDR, 1080p@30 fps
- Display: 6.8", 2460 × 1080, P-OLED capacitive touchscreen, 16M colors, 41:18 aspect ratio, 395 ppi
- External display: 3.9", 1240 × 1080, G-OLED, 31:27 aspect ratio, 419 ppi
- Sound: Mono loudspeaker
- Connectivity: Wi-Fi 802.11a/b/g/n/ac (2.4 & 5GHz), dual-band, Wi-Fi Direct, DLNA, Bluetooth 5.1, A2DP, LE
- Model: LM-F100EMW; LM-F100N; LM-F100TM (T-Mobile); LM-F100VM (AT&T Mobility); LM-F100VMY (Verizon Wireless)
- Other: Qualcomm Quick Charge™ 4+, MIL-STD 810G Compliance, IP54 splash proof
- Website: www.lg.com/us/mobile-phones/wing-5g

The LG Wing 5G is a phablet smartphone manufactured by LG Electronics, announced on September 14, 2020 and became available on October 15, 2020. The device features a swivel design where the main display can be rotated to form a T-shape, revealing a smaller secondary display. It runs on the Android operating system.

On April 5, 2021, LG announced it would be shutting down its mobile phone division and ceasing production of all remaining devices. LG noted the phone would be available until existing inventory ran out. This was considered the last LG flagship phone — all other phones after the LG Wing up until 2021 were either mid-range or budget friendly phones.

== Design ==
The LG Wing uses an anodised aluminium frame with chamfered edges; both displays and the back panel are protected by unspecified glass. The lower screen has a high lubricity polylectal that surrounds the front panel. The top bezel of the lower section houses the earpiece. There are two color options, Aurora Gray and Illusion Sky.

It can be used like a conventional smartphone in its default state, or in any orientation in swivel mode. Turning the main display clockwise activates swivel mode, where the main display has a landscape mode showing the date and time, as well as an app carousel. In addition to running two apps simultaneously, the secondary display can act as a digital camera gimbal or media controls.

=== Hinge ===
The phone utilises a hinge that can rotate 90 degrees. The hinge has a double locking mechanism, and is secured by two springs which guide the phone to an opened or closed position. A small hydraulic damper allows for more refined movements of the hinge. LG rated the mechanism as supporting up to 200,000 uses.

Demonstration of the hinge feature.

== Hardware ==
The LG Wing is powered by the Qualcomm Snapdragon 765G and Adreno 620 GPU. It has 128 or 256 GB of UFS internal storage, paired with 8 GB of LPDDR4X RAM. MicroSD card expansion is supported through a hybrid dual-SIM slot, up to 2 TB.

The main display is shared with the Velvet and V60 ThinQ, a 6.8" FHD+ P-OLED with a 41:18 aspect ratio, and the secondary display is a 3.9" G-OLED with an 31:27 aspect ratio. The main display also features an under-screen optical fingerprint scanner. The battery capacity is 4000 mAh, and can be recharged wired over USB-C at up to 25 W (Quick Charge 4.0+) or wirelessly via Qi at up to 13 W.

=== Camera ===
The camera array is located in the corner with a rectangular protrusion housing three cameras. The rear cameras are similar to the V60's, with identical 64 MP wide and 13 MP ultrawide sensors. The third camera is an additional 12 MP ultrawide sensor which is used for the digital camera gimbal. The front-facing camera is concealed by a motorised pop-up mechanism, and uses a 32 MP sensor.

== Software ==
The LG Wing runs on Android 10 and uses LG's UX 9.
