= V35 =

V35, or similar, may refer to:

- Beechcraft Bonanza V35, an American civil utility aircraft
- Fokker V.35, a German prototype World War I fighter aircraft
- ITU-T V.35, a wideband modem standard
- LG V35 ThinQ, a smartphone
- Nissan Skyline V35, an automobile
