= LG G8 ThinQ =

2019 Android smartphone manufactured by LG Electronics

LG G8 ThinQ 4G
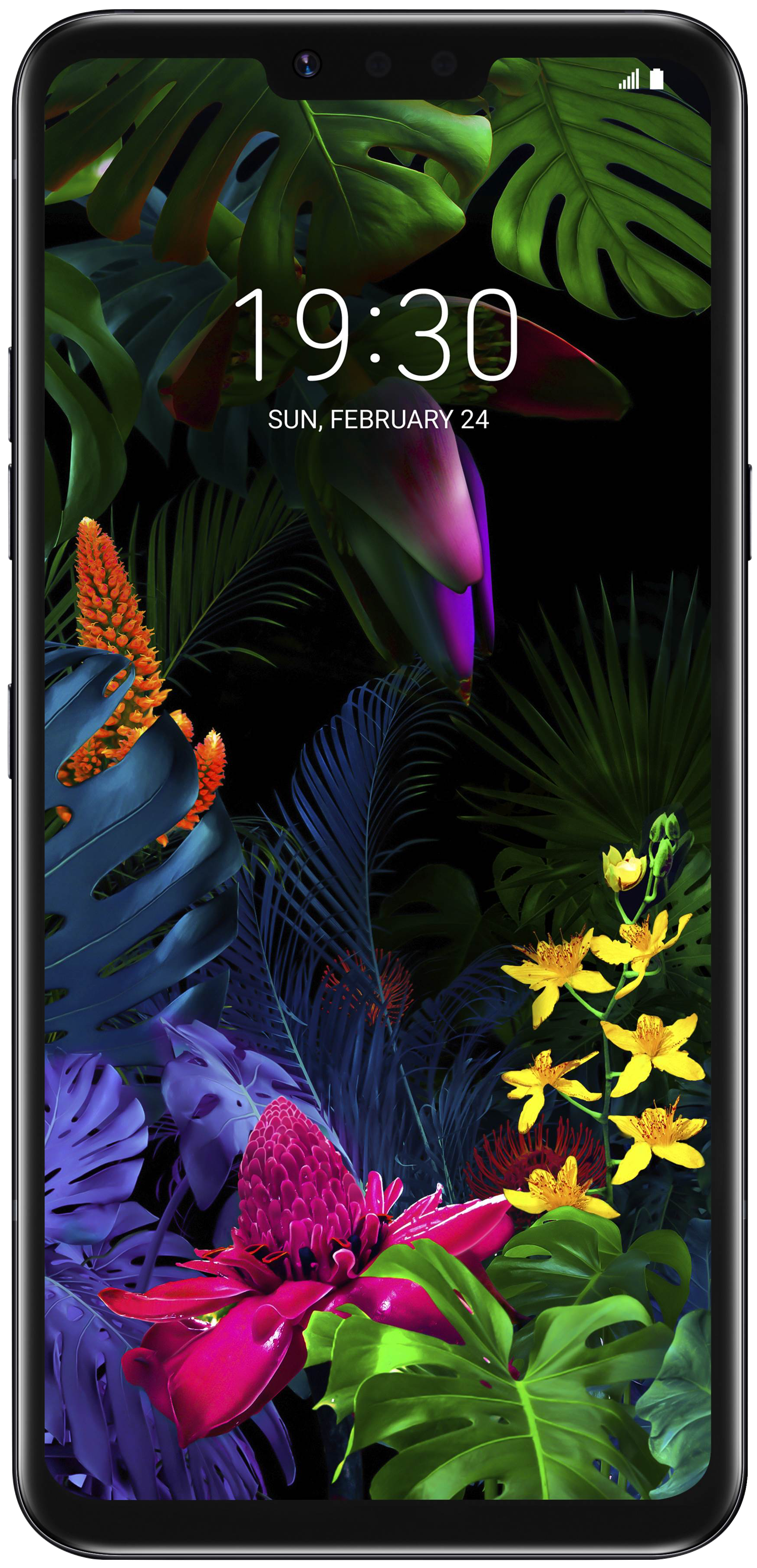
- Brand: G series
- Manufacturer: LG Electronics
- Type: Smartphone
- First released: 22 March 2019; 7 years ago
- Availability by region: 22 March 2019; 7 years ago (South Korea); 11 April 2019; 7 years ago (United States)
- Predecessor: LG G7 ThinQ
- Successor: LG Velvet
- Related: LG V50 ThinQ
- Form factor: Slate
- Dimensions: H: 5.98 in (151.9 mm) W: 2.83 in (71.8 mm) D: 0.35 in (8.4 mm)
- Weight: 167 g (5.89 oz)
- Operating system: Original: Android 9 "Pie"; Current: Android 12
- System-on-chip: Qualcomm Snapdragon 855
- CPU: Octa-core (1x 2.84GHz + 3x 2.42GHz + 4x 1.8GHz) Kryo 485
- GPU: Adreno 640
- Memory: 6 GB LPDDR4X RAM
- Storage: 128 GB
- Removable storage: microSD, up to 2TB
- Battery: 3500 mAh Li-Po, non removable
- Rear camera: Dual or Triple (market dependent*) 12MP + 16MP + 12MP 12 MP Sony IMX363 (f/1.5, 27mm, 1/2.55", 1.4μm, OIS) + 16 MP Sony IMX361 (f/1.9, 16mm, 1/3.09", 1.0μm) + 12 MP Telephoto* (f/2.4, 52mm, 1.0μm, OIS) Other Camera Specs: Dual PDAF, Manual Mode, Food Mode, Slow-Mo, Cine Video, Panorama, YouTube Live, Time-Laps, 360 Panorama, AI Composition, Night View, Google Lens, Live Photo, AR Emoji, My Avatar, Quick Sharing and Film Effect Active Autofocus, 2x optical zoom & LED flash 4K@30/60fps, 1080p@30/60fps, 720p@240fps, HDR, stereo sound rec. HDR10 video, Video Manual Mode, Video Studio
- Front camera: 8 MP, f/1.7, 26mm, 1.22μm, 1080p + ToF sensor
- Display: 6.1 in (155 mm); 3120 × 1440 1440p OLED (19.5:9 aspect ratio) (564 ppi) Dolby Vision; HDR10
- Sound: Bottom-Firing "Boombox" Speaker
- Connectivity: Type-C 1.0 reversible connector + 802.11a/b/g/n/ac Wi-fi, dual-band + Bluetooth 5.0 + NFC + Radio + GPS
- Data inputs: Fingerprint (rear-mounted), accelerometer, gyro, proximity, compass, barometer, color spectrum
- Website: LG G8 ThinQ - Archived

The LG G8 ThinQ is an Android smartphone developed by LG Electronics as part of the LG G series. It was officially announced on February 24, 2019. The device serves as the successor to the 2018 LG G7 ThinQ 4G.

== Specifications ==
=== Hardware ===
The LG G8 ThinQ utilizes a metal chassis with a glass backing, and is IP68-rated for water and dust-resistance. It is available in black, gray and red color finishes. The G8 features a 1440p FullVision AMOLED display, with a diagonal size of 6.1 inches and a 19.5:9 aspect ratio. The G8 is the first G series phone to have an OLED display, as this had previously been reserved for V series phones starting with the V30.

The G8 utilizes the Qualcomm Snapdragon 855 system-on-chip with 6 GB of RAM. It is offered with 128 GB of internal storage, expandable via SD card. It supports wireless charging, and all models will support Qualcomm Quick Charge 3.0. All models in all markets will include quad Digital-to-analog converters (DAC) to enhance sound output.

The G8 retains the G7's biometric options but introduces a new "Hand ID" technology which reads the user's circulatory and hand patterns. The G8 also features AirMotion gesture control. These are enabled by the addition of a time-of-flight sensor called the Z camera.

Additionally, the G8 keeps the G7's Boombox speaker and adds "Crystal Sound" which vibrates the screen to work as a speaker in place of a traditional earpiece. However, the G8 still has a conventional bottom-speaking speaker.

In line with its predecessor G7, there is a button on the side of the phone similar to Samsung's Bixby button; while it cannot be remapped, it launches Google Assistant when held, rather than a different A.I. Double tapping the button launches Google Lens.

The camera is a dual or triple setup depending on the market, with a primary lens, wide-angle lens and a telephoto lens exclusive to Korea; the primary and telephoto units are 12 MP, while the wide-angle unit is 16 MP. The telephoto lens is omitted in other markets, where the phone has a dual camera setup instead. On the front, an 8 MP selfie shooter lives inside the notch, paired with a time-of-flight sensor used for depth mapping.

The G8's battery is a 16.7% increase over its predecessor, totaling 3500 mAh.

=== Software ===
The G8 ThinQ ships with Android 9 "Pie" and LG's UX skin. In November 2019, LG began to release Android 10 for the G8 ThinQ.

As of late 2023, Android 12 started to rollout to select models in an over the air update.

== Reception ==
The Verge gave the G8 a 6.5, praising the ergonomics, Quad DAC, Face Unlock and battery life, while criticizing the piezoelectric earpiece and Hand ID and AirMotion, noting that it "may not receive timely software updates". Engadget gave the G8 a 73, calling it "a wasted opportunity". Velazco praised the design, display and performance and had similar complaints. CNET gave the G8 an 8.5, remarking that "the LG G8 ThinQ is an objectively great phone...with a high price tag and no standout features", but was critical of portrait mode for video.

The G8x received mixed reviews as well, with a 7 from The Verge, a 74 from Engadget, an 8.3 from CNET, 4 stars from TechRadar and 3 stars from Digital Trends.

The G8s received praise from Notebook Check for having decent battery life and good speakers, but was criticized for its poor low-light camera performance.

The triple-camera variant of the G8 received an overall score of 96 on DxOMark, with a photo score of 99 and a video score of 89, tying it with the OnePlus 6. While not ranked among the top smartphone cameras on the site, its score is a 13-point improvement over its predecessor and a 2-point improvement over the V40.

== Variants ==
=== LG G8s ThinQ ===
The LG G8s ThinQ was released in select markets in Europe, Latin America, Africa and the Middle East in July 2019. Visually, the G8s is differentiated from the G8 by a larger notch and more color options. It uses the same chipset as the G8 while having slower charging (18W compared to 21W on the G8), a marginally larger 3550mAh battery and a 64 GB model. The display is larger at 6.21 inches, but is 1080p (1080 × 2248). The G8s has a triple camera setup in all markets, but the camera sees some slight downgrades in terms of aperture and focal length while having a lower resolution ultrawide sensor. The G8s has stereo speakers like the G8, but lacks the G8's Crystal Sound technology.

=== LG G8x ThinQ ===
The LG G8x ThinQ was released in November 2019 with newer LG UX 9 software. A Dual Screen accessory is bundled with the device and connects via the USB-C port. It can run two apps simultaneously or extend the display when using a web browser. The screen is 6.4" with Gorilla Glass 6, and is 1080p (1080 × 2340). A monochrome panel on the opposite side shows the time, date, battery level, and a few notification icons. A dual camera setup is present on the rear, with no telephoto sensor. The selfie camera is 32 MP as opposed to 8 MP on the G8 and G8s. Additionally, while recording videos users can now switch between the front and rear camera. The device uses an under-display optical scanner, and the battery is larger as well at 4000mAh. The device was launched in South Korea as the LG V50S ThinQ with 5G capabilities.

== See also ==
- LG G series

Preceded by LG G7 ThinQ	LG G8 ThinQ; 2019	Succeeded by LG Velvet
