= LG V20 =

Android smartphone by LG Electronics

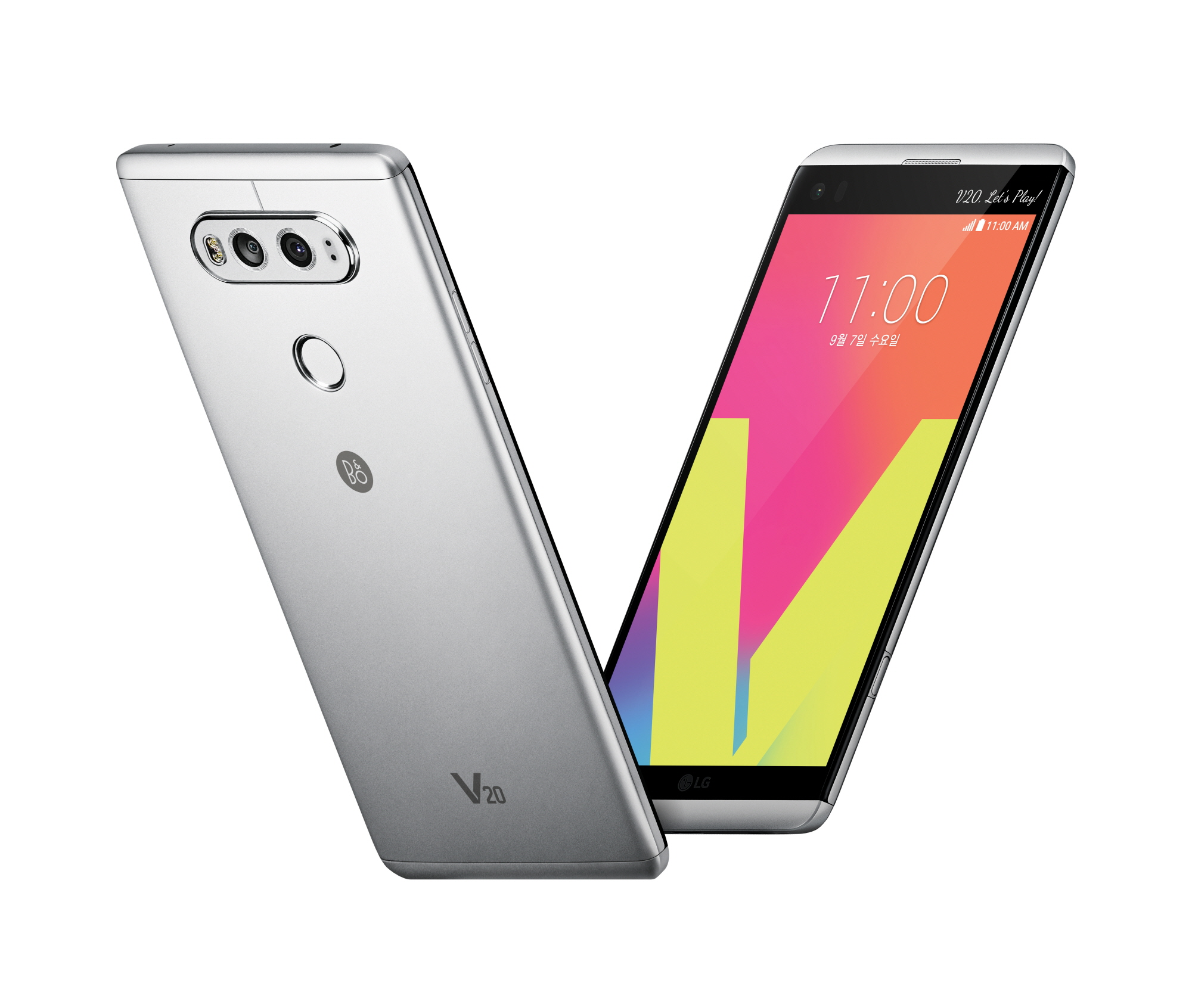
- LG V20
- Brand: LG Electronics
- Manufacturer: LG Electronics
- Type: Phablet
- Series: V series LG Ultra-Premium Category
- First released: September 29, 2016; 10 years ago (South Korea); October 14, 2016; 10 years ago (Philippines); October 21, 2016; 10 years ago (U.S.A.); November 2016; 9 years ago (United Arab Emirates); November 8, 2016; 9 years ago (Australia); December 2016; 9 years ago (India)
- Discontinued: 2020
- Predecessor: LG V10
- Successor: LG V30
- Related: LG G5, LG Q8
- Compatible networks: 4G+/LTE-A; X12 LTE Cat.12 up to 600 Mbps download speed
- Form factor: Slate
- Dimensions: 159.7×78.1×7.6 mm (6.29×3.07×0.30 in)
- Weight: 174 g (6.1 oz)
- Operating system: Original: Android 7.0 "Nougat" Current: Android 8.0 "Oreo" (international); Android 9.0 "Pie" (F800L/S/K only) Unofficial alternative: Android 10, Android 11, Android 12.1, Android 13, Android 14, Android 15
- System-on-chip: Qualcomm Snapdragon 820
- CPU: Quad-core (2x2.15 GHz Kryo & 2x1.6 GHz Kryo), HMP (2clusters), MSM8996, ARMv8 64bit architecture, 14 nm
- GPU: Adreno 530 with VulkanAPI 1.0 full support
- Memory: 4 GB LPDDR4 RAM (3.7 GB usable)
- Storage: 64GB (52GB usable), encrypted EXT4 Filesystem
- Removable storage: microSDXC up to 2 TB*(TexFAT Filesystem)
- Battery: 3,200 mAh/12.3Wh (removable); LG BL-44E1F Li-Ion
- Rear camera: 16 MP f/1.8 aperture 75° normal angle lens; 8 MP f/2.4 aperture 135° wide angle lens; OIS,2x Optical zoom, 4K/30fps video recording, Support Google CameraAPI2 manual mode, PDAF(Phase Detection AutoFocus) and Laser AF(LDAF) with Contrast AF, Dual LED flash
- Front camera: 5 MP f/1.9 aperture,83/120° wide-angle lens, FullHD 1080p video recording
- Display: 5.7 in (140 mm) QuadHD 2560×1440 1440p (515 ppi) LG Quantum IPS LCD Corning Gorilla Glass 4 Screen Protection; Secondary display 2.1 in (53 mm) 160×1040
- Sound: Bottom-firing mono speaker, ESS Sabre "32bit Hi-Fi" QuadDAC+Headphones Amplifier
- Connectivity: USB-C 1.0 reversible USB2.0 speed, Bluetooth 4.2 with AptX-HD, LE, A2DP, NFC(File sending and Tap&Pay), GLONASS GPS support, IR for LG Remote, Wi-Fi a/b/g/n/ac with dual-band(2.4GHz and 5GHz), FM radio with RDS)
- Model: H990DS (Global Dual-SIM); Asia: H990N (Hong Kong); America: H910 (AT&T); H918 (T-Mobile); LS997 (Sprint); US996 (US Cellular); VS995 (Verizon); H990T (Mexico); H915 (Canada); Korea: F800L (LG U+); F800S (SK Telecom); F800K (KTF)
- Other: MIL-STD810G US Military standard Drop protection, AL6013 body, PolyCarbonate plastic up&down**, Metal battery cover with NFC antenna, rear-mounted Fast Fingerprint sensor, QuickCharge 3.0, USB Power Delivery Rev. 2, Steady Record 2.0, 24bit/192kHz Studio Quality sound recording to in FLAC audio format, Barometer sensor,"Game battery saver" energy saving function
- Website: lg.com/us/mobile-phones/v20

The LG V20 is an Android phablet smartphone manufactured by LG Electronics, in its LG V series, succeeding the LG V10 released in 2015. Unveiled on September 6, 2016, it was the first phone with the Android Nougat operating system. Like the V10, the V20 has a secondary display panel near the top of the device that can display additional messages and controls, and a quad DAC for audio. The V20 has a user-replaceable battery, unlike its successor, the LG V30, unveiled on 31 August 2017.

== Specifications ==
The LG V20 was released in 2016 as LG's second V-series flagship smartphone. Its list of specifications includes the Qualcomm Snapdragon 820 system-on-chip, 4GB of RAM and 64GB of storage, 5.7-inch Quad HD (2560×1440) IPS LCD with additional secondary display, dual 16MP (75°, f/1.8) + 8MP (135°, f/2.4) rear cameras, 5MP (120°, f/1.9) front-facing camera, and a 3,200mAh removable battery.

=== Hardware ===
The LG V20 continues the user-friendly hardware access design of the LG G5, having a removable back chassis of aluminum alloy for a significantly streamlined and convenient battery removal as well as easy access to internal components for any repairs, with polycarbonate plastic top and bottom caps, a USB-C connector compliant with Qualcomm's Quick Charge 3.0, and a rear-mounted power button with an integrated fingerprint reader. It is available in Dark Grey (named "Titan"), Pink, and Silver color finishes. The V20 features a 5.7-inch 1440p IPS LCD with up to 500 nits of brightness, coated in Gorilla Glass 4, utilizing the Qualcomm Snapdragon 820 processor with 4 GB of LPDDR4 RAM. The device includes 64 GB of internal storage, expandable via microSD card up to 2TB, and a 3,200 mAh removable battery. The removable aluminum alloy cover, as well as the removable battery, is designed to act as shock and impact dissipation in the event that the V20 is dropped, in which case both will pop out from the main body and absorb the impact, dispersing the weight over the battery and cover, leaving the main components and screen less affected by drop damage compared to other smartphones. This makes the LG V20 one of the most drop shock resistant, durable and resilient consumer smartphones currently available. Similar to the V10, a second, supplemental display is located at the top of the device to the right of the 120° wide-angle front-facing camera. The secondary separate display can be used to show notifications, access controls, and apps, as well as display time and incoming messages. Both screens were made larger and brighter than those found on the V10.

Additional features include an IR blaster, FM radio, a dedicated 24-bit high fidelity audio recorder able to record up to 24-bit/192 kHz with manual channel controls for effective noise elimination of up to 50% in audio/video recording compared to other smartphone audio recorders, Bluetooth 4.2, NFC, as well as dual sim support for the H990N/H990DS international versions which doesn't take the microSD card slot like in most other dual sim supported smartphones. The V20 shipped with Bang & Olufsen H3 in-ear headphones for a limited time, and the phone's audio specifications and sound is tuned by the same company in some countries, including the international variants (indicated by the B&O logo on the back of the cover). Every model of the V20 includes the dedicated ESS Sabre ES9218 32-bit Hi-Fi Quad DAC, able to drive up to 600 ohm headphones to enhance wired headphones sound output quality with specifications of 130 dB SNR, 124 dB DNR and -112 dB THD+N. The LG V20 was the most powerful smartphone to have a removable battery at the time, having later been superseded by the newer Fairphone devices.

Videos can be recorded with FLAC (lossless) audio tracks.

=== Software ===
The V20 shipped with Android 7.0 Nougat and LG UX 5.0+ software. It was the first Android device to ship with Nougat. Updates to Android 8.0 Oreo and then Android 9.0 Pie for various models were released, but later versions were never officially released.

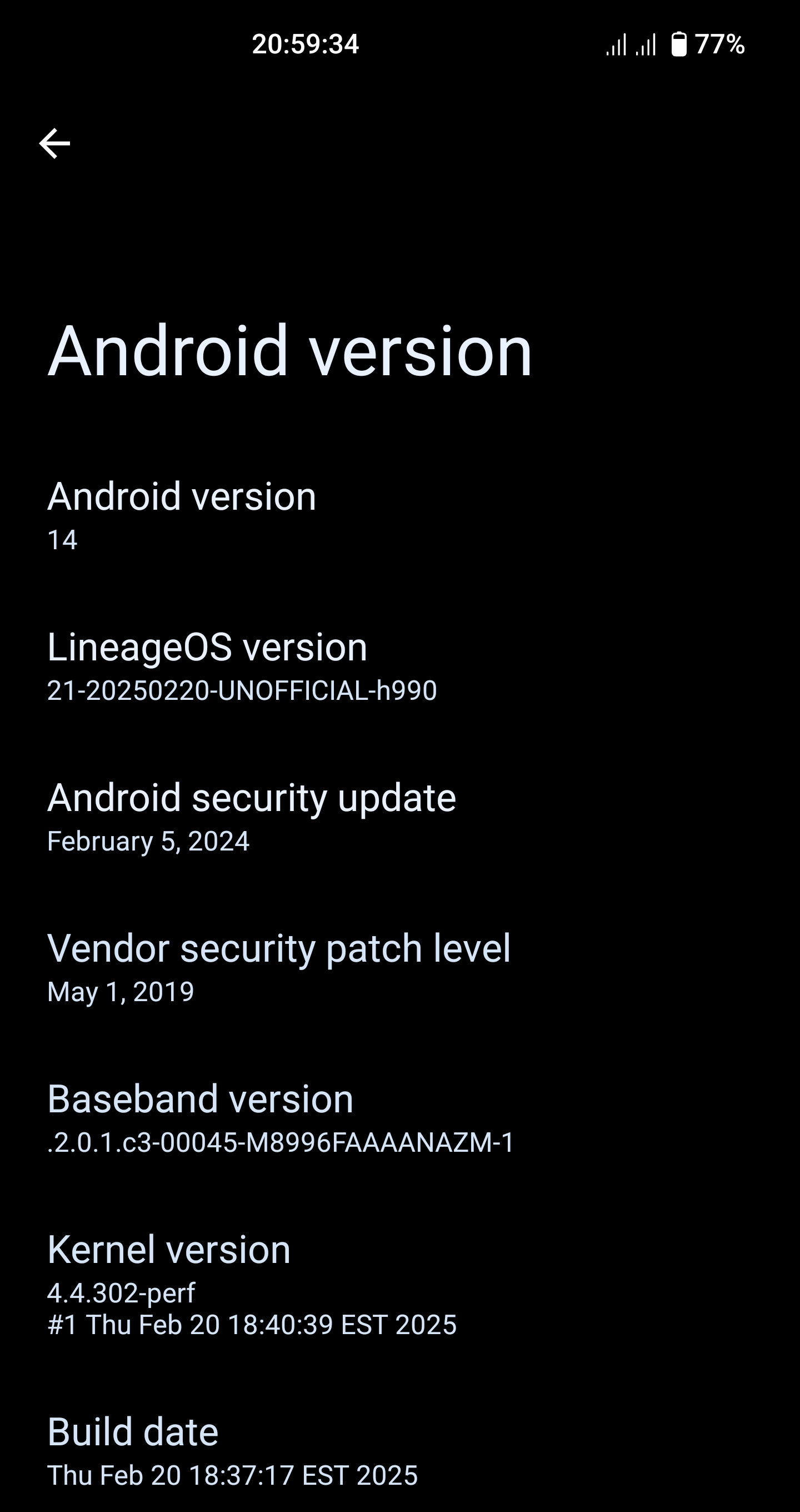
LG V20 running LineageOS 21 2025/02/20

LG previously supported officially unlocking the bootloader on the US996 and H990 versions, which allowed the device to be rooted and custom ROM images to be installed. But there is no longer any LG support for unlocking most V20 bootloaders; it is possible though means of DirtySanta (except the H918 T-Mobile version which instead relies on Lafsploit to flash partitions), but it is difficult and with the risk of damaging the phone, and custom ROM images such as LineageOS have been unofficially produced.

== Unique features ==
The V20's features included a user-replaceable battery and higher quality audio than the competition. It also had an infrared (IR) blaster that allowed it to control televisions and other remote controlled devices.

It was one of the few phones at the time with an ultrawide camera, as well as laser autofocus. It had high acoustic overload point (AOP) microphones that allowed recording in very loud concert settings. It also had configurable bitrate video and audio recording, with lossless audio and steerable sound focus and waveform display while recording.

As of Q1 2024, the V20 remains the only phone with a user-replaceable battery, DAC audio, 3.5mm headphone jack and IR transmitter. The phone developed a cult following, despite the bloatware and lack of an easily unlocked bootloader.
