= LG G7 ThinQ =

Android smartphone developed by LG Electronics

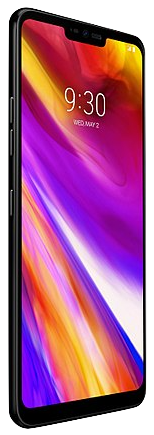
- Brand: G series
- Manufacturer: LG Electronics
- Type: Smartphone
- Predecessor: LG G6
- Successor: LG G8 ThinQ
- Related: LG V40 ThinQ, LG Q6, LG Q7, LG Q9
- Form factor: Slate
- Dimensions: 153.2 x 71.9 x 7.9 mm (6.03 x 2.83 x 0.31 in)
- Weight: 162 g (5.75 oz)
- Operating system: Original: Android 8.0 "Oreo"; Current: Android 10/11; Unofficial alternative: Android 14
- System-on-chip: Qualcomm Snapdragon 845
- CPU: Octa-core (4x 2.8GHz & 4x 1.8GHz) Kryo
- GPU: Adreno 630
- Memory: 4 GB/6 GB LPDDR4 RAM
- Storage: 64 or 128 GB
- Removable storage: microSDXC
- Battery: 3000 mAh Li-Po, non removable
- Rear camera: 16 MP (f/1.6, OIS) + 16 MP wide angle (f/1.9), active autofocus, LED flash 2160p@30/60fps 1080p@30/60fps, Slow-Motion 720p@240fps, HDR10, stereo sound rec.
- Front camera: 8 MP, f/1.9, 1080p
- Display: 6.09 in (155 mm) (full rectangle); 5.94 in (151 mm) (without notch); 3120 × 1440 1440p IPS LCD (19.5:9 aspect ratio) (564 ppi) Dolby Vision; HDR10
- Sound: Mono "boombox" speaker, 3.5 mm stereo audio jack
- Connectivity: Type-C 1.0 reversible connector + 802.11 a/b/g/n/ac Wi-fi, dual-band + Bluetooth 5.0 + NFC + Radio + GPS
- Data inputs: Fingerprint (rear-mounted), accelerometer, gyro, proximity, compass, barometer, color spectrum
- Website: https://lg.com/us/mobile-phones/g7-thinq

The LG G7 ThinQ, commonly referred to as just LG G7, is an Android smartphone developed by LG Electronics as part of the LG G series. It was officially announced on May 2, 2018, after about a week of official leaks by LG. It is the second product from LG that uses the ThinQ branding. The device serves as the successor to the 2017 LG G6.

== Specifications ==
=== Hardware ===
The LG G7 ThinQ utilizes a metal chassis with a glass backing, and is IP68-rated for water and dust-resistance. It is available in black, blue, rose and silver-coloured finishes. A dedicated side button launches the Google Assistant when pressed, and launches Google Lens on a double-press; it cannot be remapped to other functions. The G7 features a 1440p FullVision IPS LCD, with a diagonal size of 6.1-inches and a 19.5:9 aspect ratio, making it the world's first Android phone with that aspect ratio. The display is capable of a maximum brightness of 1000 nits, and is HDR10-compatible for video playback with high-dynamic-range (HDR) color.

The G7 utilizes the Qualcomm Snapdragon 845 system-on-chip with 4 GB of RAM. It is offered with 64 GB of internal storage, expandable via microSD card. An SKU known as the LG G7+ ThinQ was released in some markets, which bumps these specifications to 6 GB of RAM and 128 GB of storage. The G7 supports wireless charging and Qualcomm Quick Charge 4. The G7 includes a 3.5 mm headphone jack with quad digital-to-analog converters (DAC) to enhance sound.

The G7 has dual 16 MP rear-facing cameras, with the second having a 107° wide-angle lens. Its camera app features an object recognition “AI Cam” mode to automatically adjust camera settings based on the subject of the image.

=== Software ===
The LG G7 ThinQ ships with Android 8.0 “Oreo” and LG's UX skin. On June 29, 2018 a software update introduced 4K video recording at 60 FPS. In January 2019, LG released an update to Android 9 in South Korea. 2020 saw Android 10 updates in most regions.

== Variants ==
=== LG G7 One ===
The LG G7 One was released in selected markets (such as Canada) in late-2018 as part of the Android One program. It is visually identical to the G7 ThinQ, except the glass backing has a softer, frosted finish, as opposed to the polished appearance of the ThinQ. Its hardware is slightly downgraded from the G7 ThinQ, utilizing a Snapdragon 835 system-on-chip over the 845, 4 GB of RAM and 32 GB of expandable storage, a 3,000 mAh battery, and removing the second, wide-angle rear camera lens. As with all Android One phones, it uses the standard Android user interface and Google apps instead of LG UX (similarly to the former Nexus series, such as the LG-manufactured Nexus 5X); it ships with Android 8.1, and LG committed to releasing at least two major releases of Android for the device, as well as providing three years of security patch support. Android 9 was released for the G7 One in November 2018, followed by Android 10 in December 2019, and Android 11 in March 2021.

In December 2018, the G7 One was released in Japan as the LG X5 Android One. In January 2019, it was announced for South Korea as the LG Q9 One, exclusively to LG U+ in a 64 GB model.

MobileSyrup noted some regressions over the G7 ThinQ due to the differences in hardware, especially in regard to battery life (such as the SoC downgrade resulting in a lack of Quick Charge 4+ support, and the G7 line's use of LCD over OLED as affecting its efficiency), but that the G7 One was “mostly fluid” and retained much of the ThinQ's hardware features (such as its audio support) while using the “stock” Android experience over LG's often-criticized software suite. Due to its positioning and launch pricing, comparisons were drawn to the OnePlus 6T, which had the same SoC as the G7 ThinQ, an OLED display, and a larger battery, but lacked the G7 One's HDR support, headphone jack with a DAC, and IP certification for waterproofing.

=== LG G7 Fit ===
The LG G7 Fit was unveiled alongside the G7 One; it is a low-end variant of the ThinQ model, utilizing a Snapdragon 821 SoC with 4 GB of RAM, and featuring a 16 megapixel camera. It is called the LG Q9 in South Korea.

== See also ==
- LG G series

| Preceded by LG G6 | LG G7 ThinQ; 2018 | Succeeded by LG G8 ThinQ |
