= LG V30 =

Android-based smartphone

LG V30 LG V30+
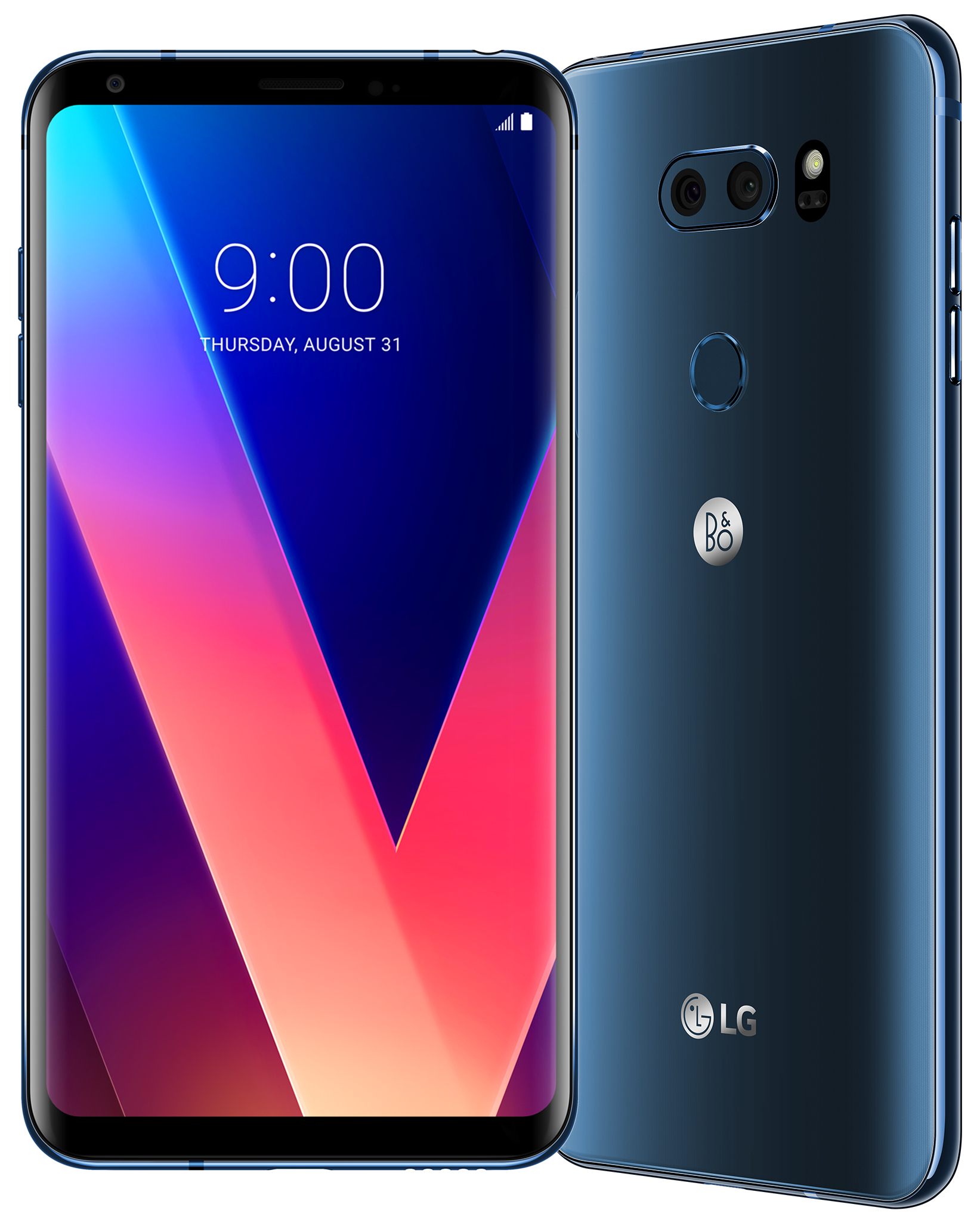
- Brand: LG Electronics
- Manufacturer: LG Electronics
- Type: Smartphone
- Series: V series
- First released: September 21, 2017; 9 years ago
- Availability by region: 21 September 2017: South Korea; 12 October 2017: Canada; 1 November 2017: Italy; United Kingdom; 1 December 2017: United States (unlocked); 2 December 2017: Singapore; 22 December 2017: Japan (LGV35); 25 January 2018: Japan (L-01K); 23 March 2018: Japan (L-02K, 10,000 units only)
- Discontinued: 2021
- Predecessor: LG V20; LG V20 Pro (L-01K); LG isai Beat (LGV35)
- Successor: LG V35, LG V40 ThinQ; LG V60 ThinQ 5G (Japan)
- Related: LG G6
- Compatible networks: GSM, HSPA, LTE
- Form factor: Slate
- Dimensions: 151.7 mm (5.97 in) H 75.4 mm (2.97 in) W 7.3 mm (0.29 in) D
- Weight: 158 g (5.6 oz)
- Operating system: Original: Android 7.1"Nougat"; Current: Android 9 "Pie"; Unofficial alternative: Android 12.1, Android 13, Android 14
- System-on-chip: Qualcomm Snapdragon 835
- CPU: Octa-core (4x2.45 GHz & 4x1.9 GHz) Kryo
- GPU: Adreno 540
- Memory: 4 GB RAM
- Storage: V30: 64 GB; V30+: 128 GB
- Removable storage: microSD, up to 256 GB
- Battery: 3,300 mAh, not user-replaceable
- Rear camera: Dual 16 MP Sony Exmor IMX351 (f/1.6, OIS, 3-axis, laser & phase detection AF) + 13 MP wide-angle (f/1.9), Video at 4K at 30fps, 1080p at 60fps, 720p at 120fps
- Front camera: 5 MP (f/2.2), facial recognition
- Display: 6 in (150 mm) 2880×1440 1440p 2:1 aspect ratio (537 ppi) P-OLED; Dolby Vision; HDR10
- Sound: Quad ESS DAC
- Model: H930 (Europe); H930DS (Hong Kong); H933 (Canada); H931 (АТ&Т); H932 (T-Mobile); VS996 (Verizon); US998 (US Cellular); LS998U (Sprint); V300 (South Korea); Japan: L-01K (V30+ for NTT Docomo); L-02K (sold as the JOJO for NTT Docomo, limited model collaborated with JoJo's Bizarre Adventure series); LGV35 (sold as the isai V30+ for au)
- Website: lg.com/au/smartphones/lg-LGH930DS-v30-smartphone

The LG V30 is an Android-based smartphone manufactured by LG Electronics as part of the LG V series. Unveiled on 31 August 2017 as the successor to the LG V20, the V30 forgoes the V20's secondary display for a "floating bar" which has nearly the same functions as the second display. It still features quad DACs for improved audio.

== History ==
The phone was teased on 3 August 2017 in a press release from LG showing the bottom half of the FullVision display. On 7 August press invitations were sent out featuring the words "Lights. Camera. Action." Video teasers were later released, advertising the phone's display, audio and camera capabilities.

== Specifications ==
=== Hardware ===
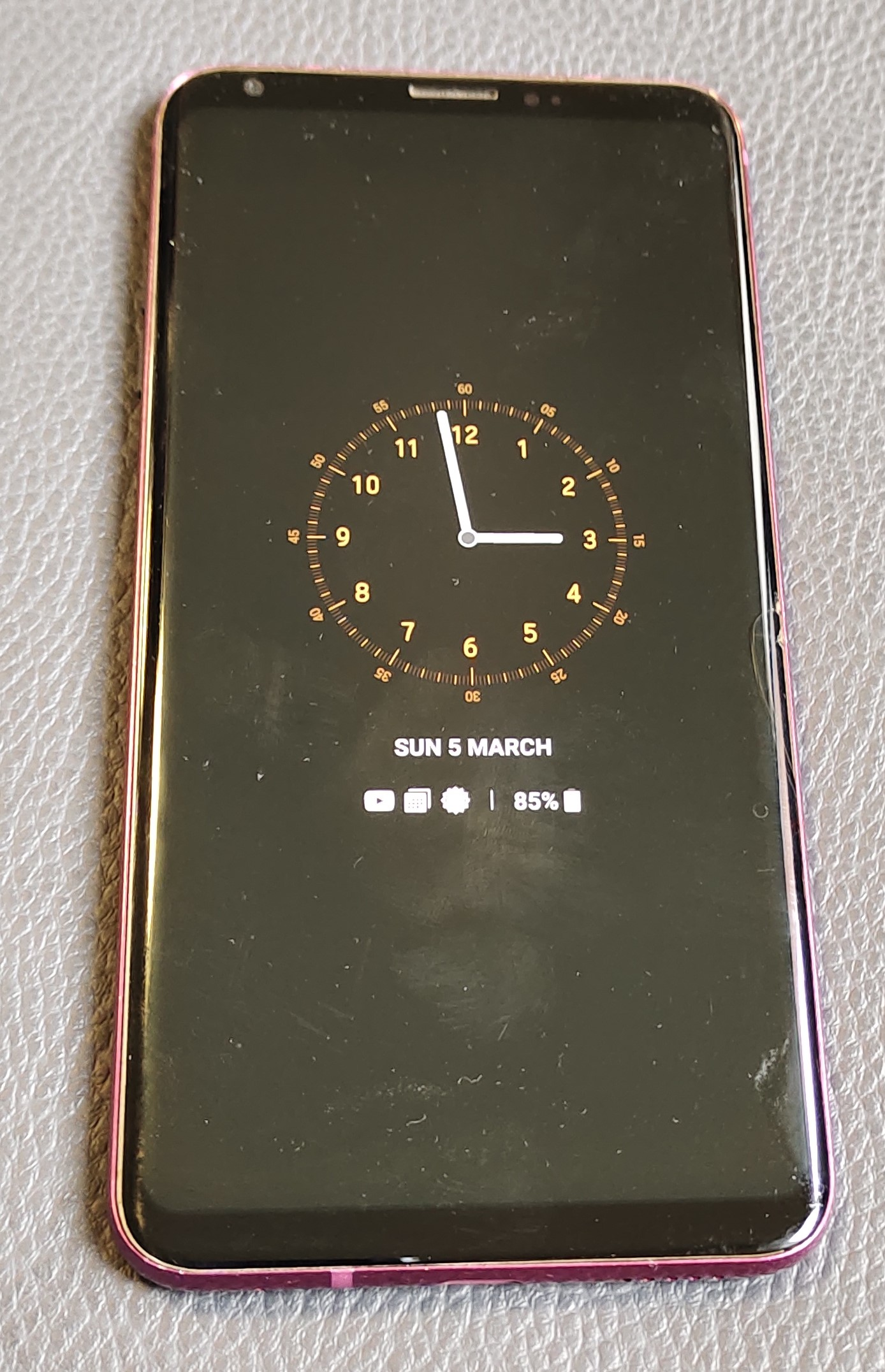
Always on display

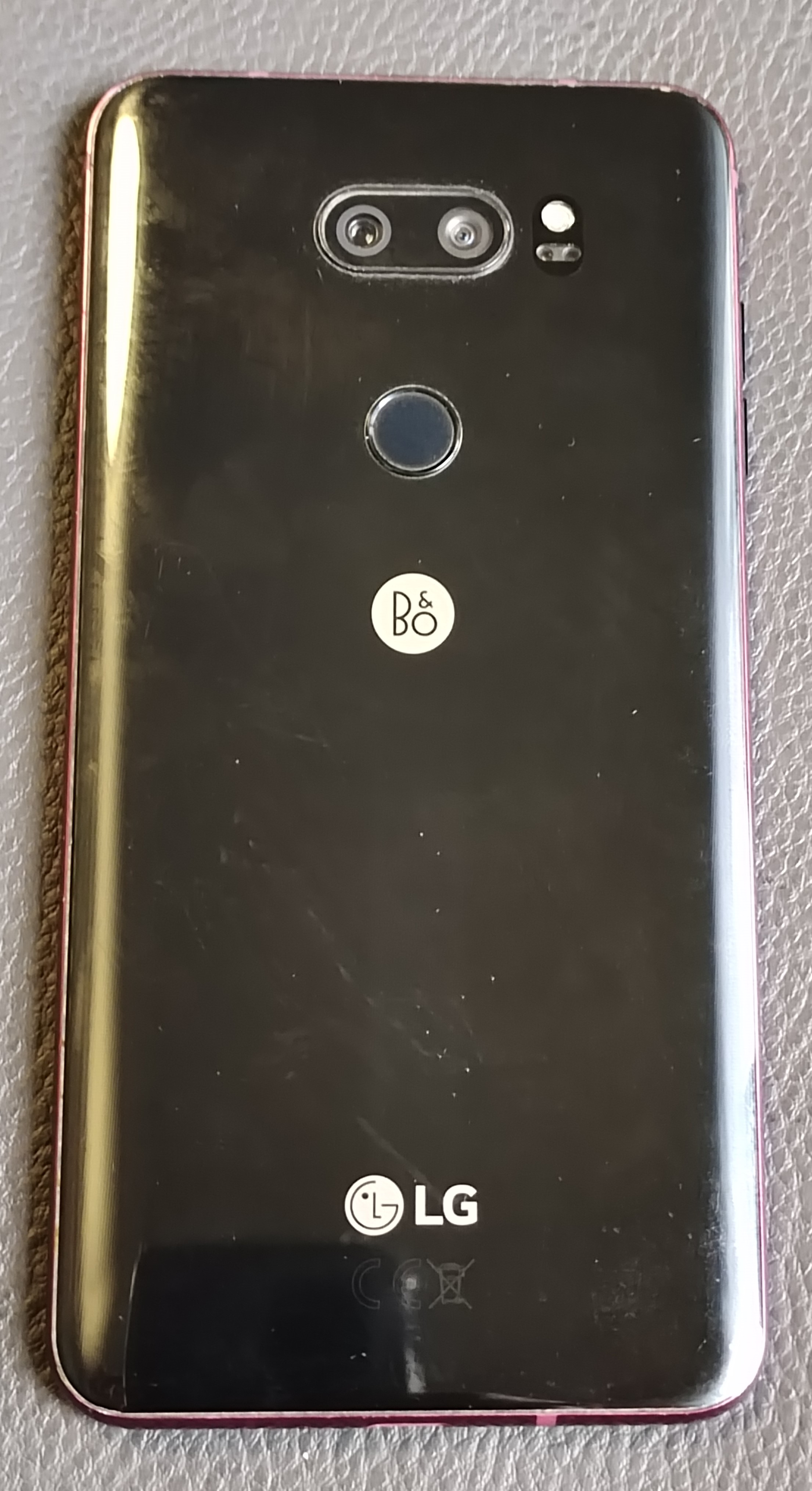
Camera, fingerprint and B & O logo

Front and back of a black LG V30.

The V30 has a Gorilla Glass 5 front and rear plate sandwiching an aluminum body and a 6.0-inch 2880x1440 P-OLED FullVision Display, with a 2:1 aspect ratio (marketed as 18:9), manufactured by LG Display. Its processor is a Qualcomm Snapdragon 835 SoC with an Adreno 540 GPU, coupled with 4 GB RAM. The V30 has 64 GB of internal storage, while the V30+ has 128 GB, which is expandable via microSD card. This is also the first LG smartphone to feature an OLED display.

The LG V30 uses a dual-lens camera setup with a 16-megapixel main sensor with a 71° field of view, and a 13-megapixel wide angle sensor with a 120° field of view. However, the main camera also features a f/1.6 aperture, the lowest in a smartphone at the time of release, and a 10-bit HDR sensor. The 10-bit HDR image sensor is capable of capturing nearly 1,070,000,000 different colors, which is about 211% more colors than an 8-bit image sensor. The main sensor has optical image stabilization, which corrects for the motion blur caused by shakey hands in photos and videos, but there is no OIS on the wide angle lens.

The V30 supports up to 1 Gbps download speed on 4G. The H932 model of the V30, for T-Mobile, is the first smartphone to support 4G's LTE Band 71, with a frequency of 600 MHz.

=== Software ===
The V30 ships with Android 7.1.2 "Nougat" (upgradeable to 9.0 but without Treble support) with LG's custom skin, LG UX 6.0+. It comes with Android's Always on Display feature.

== Reception ==
The V30 received praise for having one of the most mature dual-camera systems available and for its audio quality, retaining the headphone jack as other premium smartphones stopped providing it, and including multiple audio sensors for input and a 32-bit Quad-DAC (Digital Analog Converter) for output.

The phone was criticized for excessive bloatware on carrier-branded devices. The V30's screen quality was criticized for its relative poor calibration and other flaws, as with the Google Pixel 2 XL — which featured a display also made by LG.

== Further information ==
- Android Central — LG V30 gets torn down, shows impressive camera hardware
- Android Police — LG V30 enter the JerryRigEverything torture chamber, emerges mostly unscathed
- Latest Review - Lg V30 in 2021
