= LG G6 =

Android smartphone developed by LG Electronics

LG G6 LG G6+
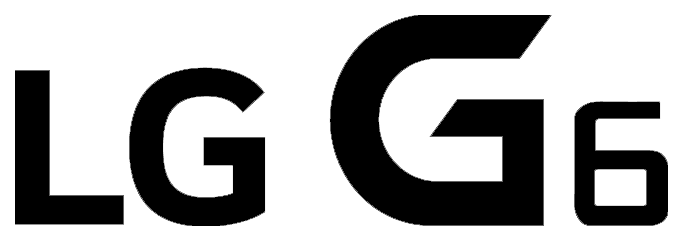

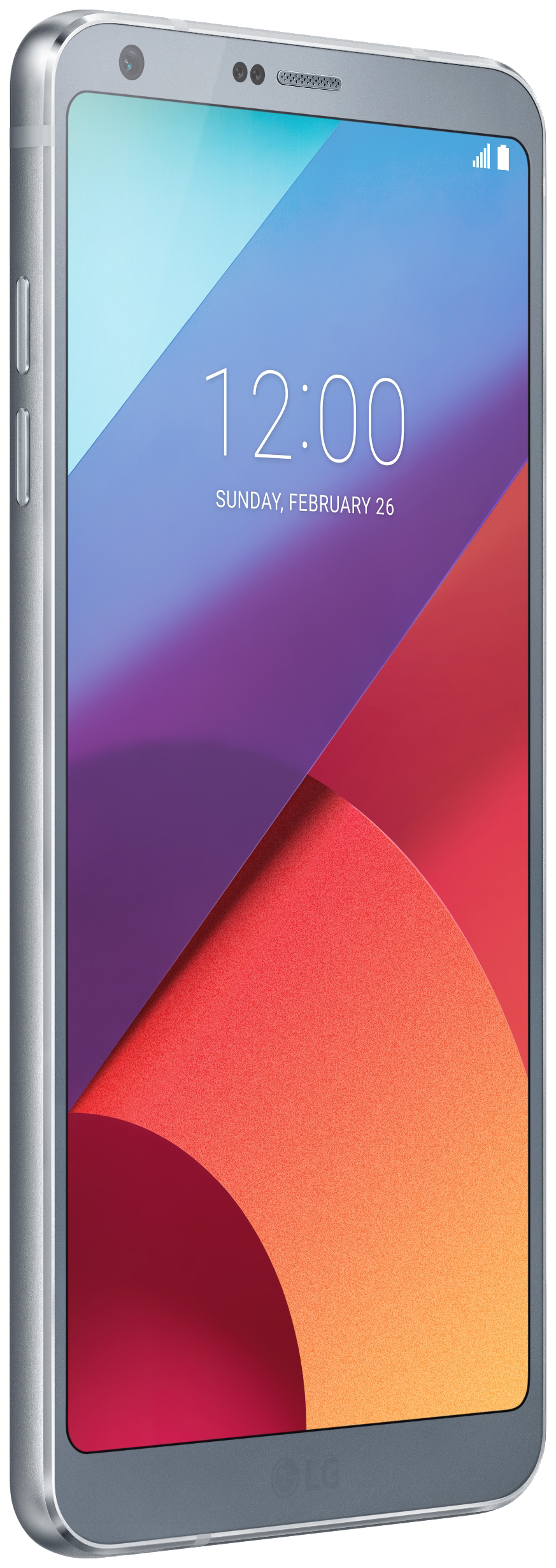
- A side view of the LG G6, showing the lockscreen and its button layout.
- Brand: G series
- Manufacturer: LG Electronics
- Type: Smartphone
- First released: February 26, 2017; 9 years ago
- Predecessor: LG G5
- Successor: LG G7 ThinQ
- Related: LG V30, LG Q6, LG Q7
- Form factor: Slate
- Dimensions: 148.9 x 71.9 x 7.9 mm (5.86 x 2.83 x 0.31 in)
- Weight: 162 g (5.7 oz)
- Operating system: Original: Android 7.0 "Nougat" Current: Android 9 "Pie"
- System-on-chip: Qualcomm Snapdragon 821
- CPU: Quad-core (2x2.35 GHz & 2x1.6 GHz) Kryo
- GPU: Adreno 530
- Memory: G6: 4 GB LPDDR4 RAM; G6+: 4 GB LPDDR4 RAM
- Storage: G6: 32 or 64 GB; G6+: 128 GB
- Removable storage: microSDXC
- Battery: 3300 mAh Li-Po, non‑removable
- Rear camera: 13 MP (f/1.8, OIS, 3-axis) + 13 MP (f/2.4 angle wide 15mm), active autofocus, LED flash 2160p@30fps, 1080p@30fps, HDR, stereo sound rec.
- Front camera: 5 MP, f/2.2, 1080p
- Display: 5.7 in (145 mm); 2880 × 1440 1440p IPS LCD (18:9 aspect ratio) (564 ppi) Dolby Vision; HDR10
- Sound: Mono speaker, 3.5 mm stereo audio jack
- Connectivity: Wi-Fi 802.11 a/b/g/n/ac, dual-band; Bluetooth; NFC; Radio; GPS
- Data inputs: Multi-touch screen; USB Type-C 3.1; Fingerprint scanner (rear-mounted); Accelerometer; Gyroscope; Proximity sensor; Compass; Barometer; Color spectrum
- Codename: lucye
- Website: www.lg.com/us/mobile-phones/g6/

The LG G6 is an Android smartphone developed by LG Electronics as part of the LG G series. It was announced during Mobile World Congress on February 26, 2017, as the successor to the 2016 LG G5.

The G6 is distinguished by its 5.7-inch display, which features a taller, 2:1 aspect ratio (marketed as 18:9), than the 16:9 aspect ratio of most smartphones. A variant, called the LG G6+ was announced on June 19, 2017 with 128 GB storage and a Hi-Fi Quad DAC.

== Specifications ==
=== Hardware ===
The LG G6 utilizes a metal chassis with a glass backing, and is IP68-rated for water and dust-resistance. It is available in black, white, and silver-coloured finishes. The G6 features a 1440p FullVision IPS LCD, with a diagonal size of 5.7-inches. LG stated that it intended for the G6 to be a large-screened phone that would still be compact and feasible for one-handed use; the display uses a 2:1 aspect ratio (marketed as "18:9") that is taller than the 16:9 displays used by the majority of smartphones. The G6 was also designed with slim bezels, and is slightly smaller in size than the G5. To allow for reinforcement around the corners of the display, the display panel itself has rounded edges. The display also supports HDR10 and Dolby Vision high-dynamic-range video.

Unlike the LG G3, G4 and G5, the LG G6's battery is non-user-replaceable.

The G6 utilizes the Qualcomm Snapdragon 821 system-on-chip with 4 GB of RAM. It is offered in models with 32 GB and 64 GB of internal storage, expandable via SD card. The G6+, on the other hand, comes with 4 GB RAM and 128 GB internal storage standard. The G6 includes a 3300 mAh battery; unlike the G5, it is not user-accessible. U.S. models support wireless charging, and all models support Qualcomm Quick Charge 3.0. Models in selected Asian markets included quad Digital-to-analog converters (DAC) to enhance sound output. The G6 drops the modular accessory system of the G5, which had been panned by critics. Similarly to the G5, the G6 features dual rear-facing cameras, with standard and wide-angle sensors. Unlike the G5, where the primary rear-facing camera has a resolution of 16 MP, but the wide-angle rear-facing camera has a resolution of only 8 MP, both cameras have a resolution of 13 MP.

=== Software ===
LG G6 ships with Android 7.0 “Nougat” and LG UX. Some of LG's in-house applications have enhanced landscape modes intended to complement the 2:1 display; the camera app features shooting modes designed for use with square, 1:1 aspect ratio photos, and can display a camera roll sidebar when taking traditional 4:3 photos. The screen size also complements Android Nougat's native split-screen mode for running multiple apps at once. LG announced that it would provide a promotional "G6 Game Collection" offer with US$200 worth of in-game content for six games on Google Play Store (Cookie Jam, Crossy Road, Genies & Gems, Spider-Man Unlimited, SimCity BuildIt and Temple Run 2), oriented towards those built for one-handed play and optimizations for the aspect ratio.

In May 2018, LG began to deploy an update to Android Oreo.

In September 2019, Android 9 ''Pie'' was released for the LG G6, although some variants of the phone are not receiving the update or the FOTA update system is not working properly for those phones.

== Reception ==
CNET contrasted the G6 with the previous year's G5, as well as its main launch competitor, the Samsung Galaxy S8. The design of the G6 was complimented for being more elegant and expansive than the G5, albeit less elegant than the similar but curved design of the Galaxy S8. LG was panned for its shift back to a non-removable battery, but the battery itself was praised for having a larger capacity than that of the G5. It was acknowledged that while the G6 does not include the latest Qualcomm Snapdragon 835 system-on-chip (making the Galaxy S8 perform better on benchmarks than the G6), there was no discernible difference in performance in real-world usage between them. The cameras were also praised for producing "sharp and vibrant images", with quality on par with other recent flagship phones. In conclusion, CNET felt that the G6 could appeal to users that had lost their trust in Samsung following the recall of the Galaxy Note 7, arguing that "while it doesn't have anything novel or buzzworthy, it's LG's most marketable and widely-appealing phone yet."

== See also ==
- LG G series

== Further information ==
- Android Authority Review
- Android Police — The LG G6 gets tortured by JerryRigEverything, emerges mostly unscathed

Preceded by LG G5	LG G6; 2017	Succeeded by LG G7 ThinQ
