= LG G5 =

Android smartphone developed by LG Electronics

LG G5 LG G5 SE

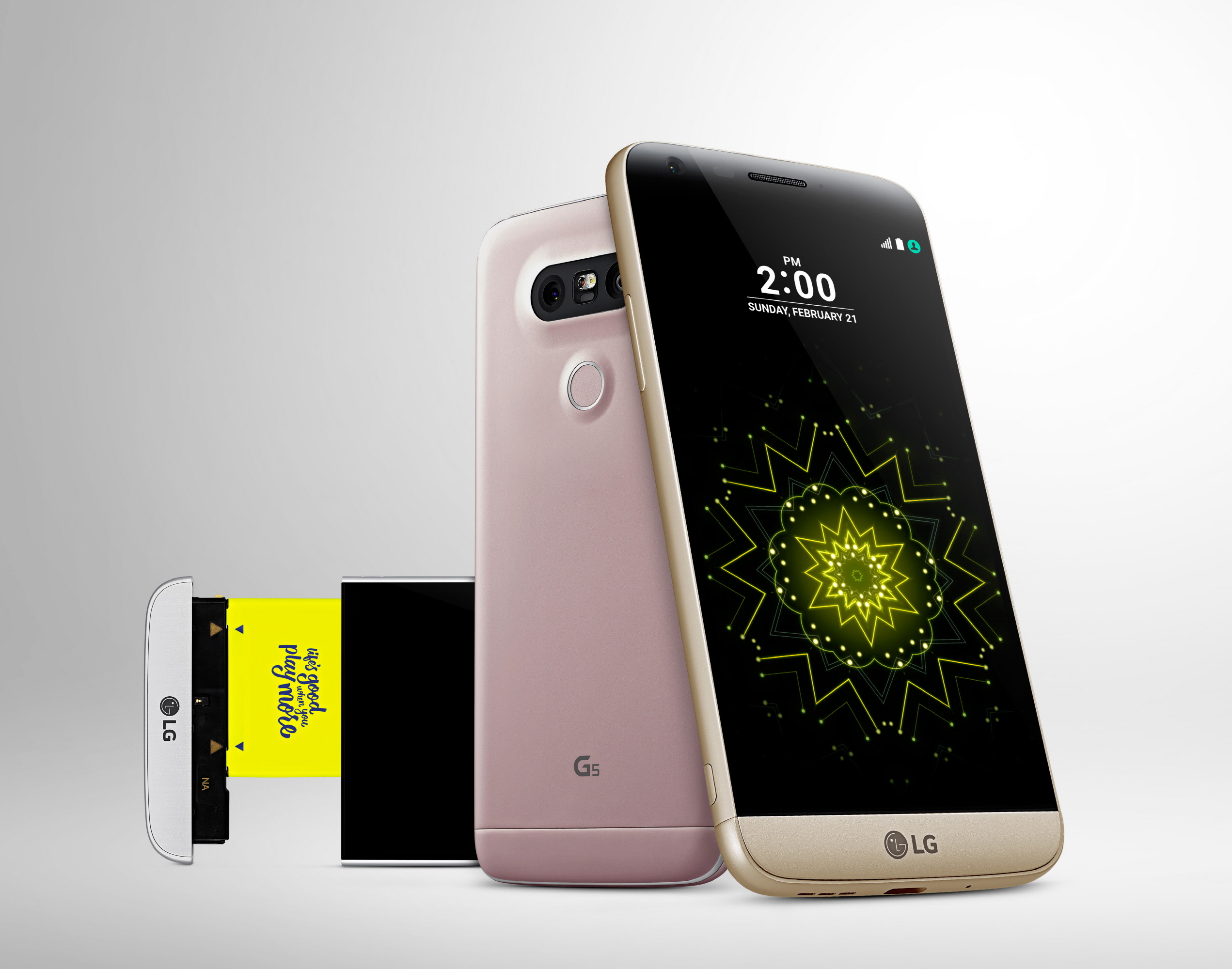
- From left to right, G5's battery access, G5's rear, G5's front
- Brand: G series
- Manufacturer: LG Electronics
- Type: Smartphone
- First released: April 23, 2016; 10 years ago
- Predecessor: LG G4
- Successor: LG G6
- Related: LG V20
- Form factor: Slate
- Dimensions: 149.4 mm (5.88 in) H 73.9 mm (2.91 in) W 7.7 mm (0.30 in) D
- Weight: 159 g (5.61 oz)
- Operating system: Original: Android 6.0.1 "Marshmallow"; Current: Android 8.1.0 "Oreo", Android 7.0 "Nougat" (Sprint models)
- System-on-chip: Qualcomm Snapdragon 820 MSM8996
- CPU: Quad-core (2x2.15 GHz Kryo & 2x1.6 GHz Kryo)
- GPU: Adreno 530
- Memory: 4 GB LPDDR4 RAM
- Storage: 32 GB
- Removable storage: microSDXC up to 2 TB
- Battery: Removable 2800‑mAh Li-Po
- Rear camera: 16 MP, Sony IMX234 Exmor RS, OIS 2.0, LED flash, f/1.8 aperture, 1/2.6" sensor, hybrid infrared autofocus; 8 MP wide-angle, ƒ/2.4 aperture
- Front camera: 8 MP, Toshiba T4KA3, f/2.0 aperture
- Display: 5.3 in (130 mm) 2560×1440 1440p IPS LCD, (554 ppi)
- Sound: Mono speaker, 3.5 mm stereo audio jack
- Connectivity: USB 2.0 (Type C connector) + 802.11 a/b/g/n/ac Wi-Fi + Bluetooth 4.2 + NFC + IR transmitter DisplayPort, HDMI, and Miracast
- Data inputs: Fingerprint sensor + accelerometer + gyro + proximity sensor + barometer + magnetometer + light sensor
- Website: www.lg.com/us/mobile-phones/g5/

The LG G5 is an Android smartphone developed by LG Electronics as part of the LG G series. It was announced during Mobile World Congress as the successor to the 2015 LG G4. The G5 is distinguished from its predecessors by its aluminum chassis and a focus on modularity. Its lower housing, which holds the user-replaceable battery, can be slid from the bottom of the device, and replaced by alternative add-on modules that provide additional functions. Two modules were available: a camera grip, and a high-fidelity audio module with DAC. A lower-spec variation, dubbed the LG G5 SE, was available in some markets.

The G5 received mixed reviews. The device was praised for its shift to all-metal construction, while maintaining its removable battery. However, the modular accessory system was criticized for its limited use cases and for its inability to perform hot swapping. LG's software, too, was panned for the quality of its customizations.

== Specifications ==
=== Hardware ===
The G5 is constructed with an aluminum unibody chassis; a “micro-dizing” process utilizing a plastic primer was used to conceal seams required for the antenna. A rounded rectangular protrusion houses the camera components. The bottom houses a USB-C connector; this connector supports USB 2.0 data transfer (compatible with USB 3) and Quick Charge 3 fast charging. Unlike previous LG G models, which had volume buttons on the back, the G5's volume controls are on its side bezel, but the circular power button—which also contains a fingerprint reader—remains on the rear. The lower “chin” can be detached to remove or replace the battery and to install add-on modules. The battery plugs into these modules, which is reinserted to replace the stock “chin”.

The G5 includes a Qualcomm Snapdragon 820 system-on-chip and 4 GB of LPDDR4 RAM. It also includes 32 GB of internal storage, expandable via MicroSD card. The G5 has a 5.3-inch 1440p IPS display. It has two rear-facing cameras; a 16 MP primary camera and an 8 MP 135° wide-angle camera. The rear camera also offers color spectrum sensor and infrared autofocus features.

The G5 supports DisplayPort, HDMI, and Miracast.

A lower-specification variation, LG G5 SE, was sold in some markets including Latin America and China. It includes a Snapdragon 652 system-on-chip instead of the Snapdragon 820, and has 3 GB of LPDDR3 RAM (instead of 4 GB of LPDDR4).

=== Software ===
The LG G5 shipped with the Android 6.0.1 “Marshmallow” operating system. Citing confusion between removing shortcuts to apps and uninstalling them entirely, the G5's home screen does not have an “app drawer”; instead, it places all apps on pages of the main home screen, like iOS does. However, there is a setting to enable the app drawer on the home screen.

The LG software includes an “always-on display” feature, which persistently displays a clock and notifications on-screen when the device is in standby. The G5 does not support Android Marshmallow's “adoptable storage” feature.

An upgrade to Android 7.0 “Nougat” was released in November 2016, followed by a final upgrade to Android 8.1.0 “Oreo” in September 2018.

LG previously officially supported unlocking the bootloader of certain G5 models. This allows them to be rooted, and allows custom ROM images to be installed. Several independent custom ROMs continued to be developed for some G5 versions independently of LG; for example LineageOS 22.2 (based on Android 15 QPR 2) continued to be developed as of October 2026.

== Accessories ==
The “Quick Cover” accessory was unveiled prior to the unveiling of the device itself; it is semi-translucent and features a window for the always-on portion of the screen. Touch inputs can be made through the cover and semi-translucent screen for actions such as accepting calls.

A line of accessories for the G5 branded as “Friends” were initially unveiled alongside the phone itself, including a wired head-mounted display known as the LG 360 VR (which attaches via the device's USB-C port), the LG 360 Cam virtual reality camera, and the LG Rolling Bot; the Rolling Bot was never released. These accessories are all managed via the LG Friends Manager application on the device, which automatically pairs and synchronizes with these devices. Two accessories utilizing the expansion slot system were unveiled; the “LG Cam Plus” accessory adds a grip to the rear of the device that incorporates physical camera controls, a jog wheel for zoom, and a supplemental battery. The “LG Hi-Fi Plus” accessory is a collaboration with Bang & Olufsen which adds a DAC, an amplifier, Direct Stream Digital audio support and upsampling, and is bundled with B&O Play H3 earbuds.

LG stated that it would allow the co-development of third-party “Friends” to integrate with the G5, although none were produced.

== Reception ==
The LG G5's overall design was praised for its shift to a metal construction. The Next Web was critical of its design, arguing that the rear of the phone looked too “boring” because it was simply a rounded rectangle with a camera enclosure and power button that “protrude in an oddly wart-like manner” and a visible seam for the chin, and noting that the lack of curvature and its “hollow” feel made the design of the G5 “less premium” than that of the G4. TechRadar was also mixed on LG's decision to re-locate the volume keys back to the bezel but maintain the rear-mounted power button as a fingerprint reader, noting that front and side-mounted fingerprint readers were easier to use—especially if the device is sitting flat. Due to its use of the Qualcomm Snapdragon 820 system-on-chip, the G5's specifications were considered to be more competitive than other flagships, unlike the G4, which used a model with reduced core count to avoid the overheating issues of the Snapdragon 810. TechRadar felt that the G5's performance was on par with the Snapdragon 820-based version of the Samsung Galaxy S7 sold in the United States, and that “in day-to-day use, and when not directly compared to its rivals' performance in a lab, it feels super slick.”

The modular accessory system received mixed reviews due to the limited number of modules designed for it, as well as the inability to hot swap modules due to the design of the system, which requires the removal of the battery. The accessories themselves also received mixed reviews; TechRadar felt that the Cam Plus and the Hi-Fi Plus did not justify their high price, and affected the device's size, but that it was “satisfying to set autofocus by half shutter key” with the Cam Plus. However, The Next Web praised the design for “solving” the historic exclusion of user-replaceable batteries from metal phones, noting that “at least having the option for customizability is pretty awesome, not to mention replacing your battery after its capacity drops in a year or two. That's something no other metal smartphone can claim.” However, the metal case does not permit wireless charging, supported by earlier “G” series phones.

The display was praised for its brightness, although The Next Web felt that its color temperature was too cool, producing a “distractingly blue-green hue” that was exacerbated by the prominent use of white in its user interface. The software of the G5 also received mixed reviews, with particular criticism directed to the removal of the app drawer from LG's default home screen. The always-on display on the G5 was praised for being more useful than that of the Galaxy S7 due to its support for displaying all notifications, and not just specific types. The Next Web lamented LG's removal of the Dual Window feature—albeit believing the removal may have been due to the inclusion of native dual window functionality on Android Nougat, and that LG's customizations were “all around less useful than Samsung's”.

== Issues ==
LG smartphone bootloop issues that mainly plagued the G4 line were also present in the G5, and the G4 lawsuit against LG was amended to include the G5, among other models. The Canadian model is not part of this suit, leaving Canadian uses without redress for defective units.

Preceded by LG G4	LG G5; 2016	Succeeded by LG G6
