= LG G4 =

Android smartphone developed by LG Electronics

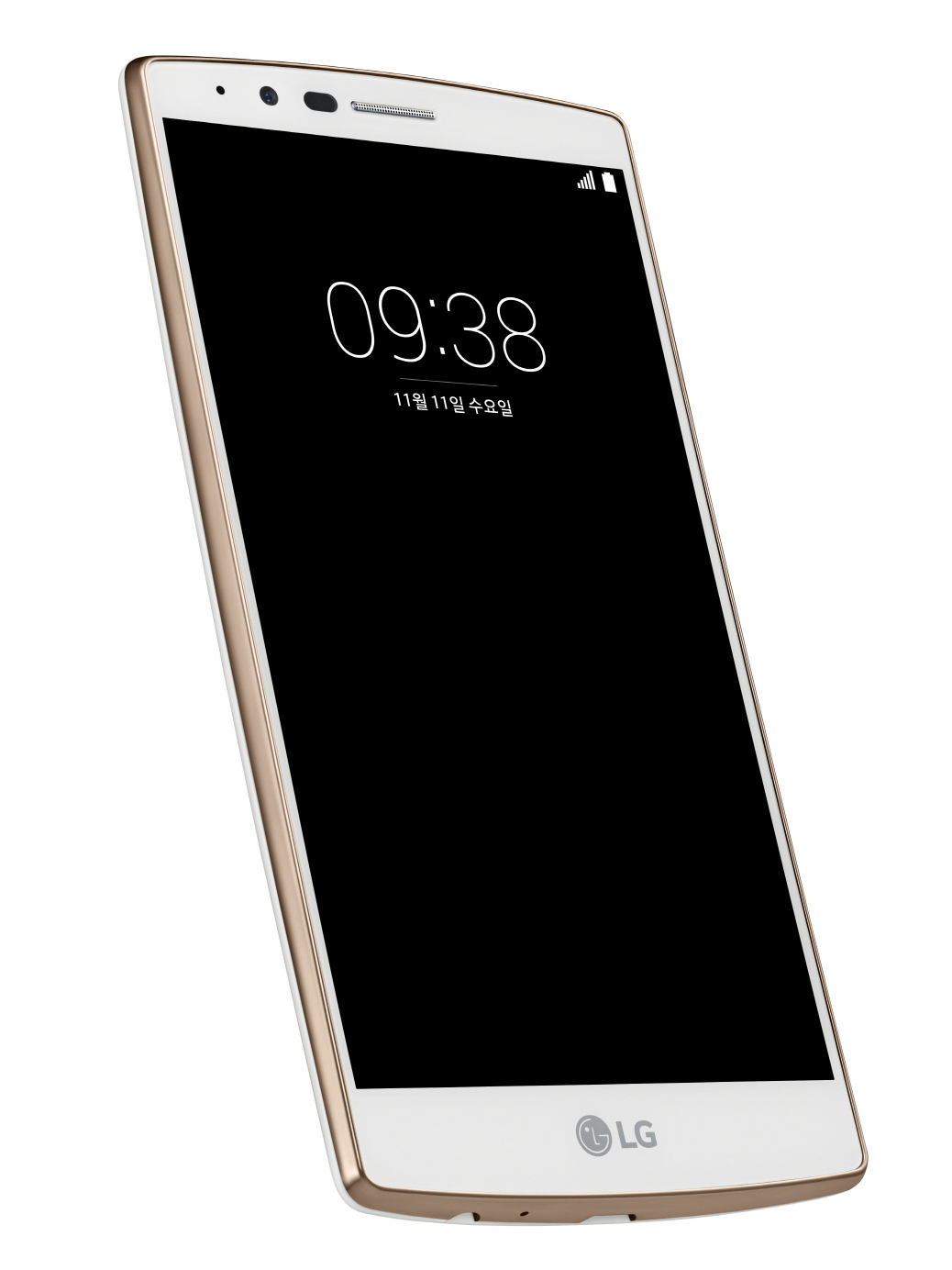
- LG G4 in White Gold Edition
- Brand: G series
- Manufacturer: LG Electronics
- Type: Smartphone
- First released: April 29, 2015; 11 years ago
- Predecessor: LG G3
- Successor: LG G5
- Related: LG G Flex 2, LG G4 Stylus, LG V10, LG Leon, Nexus 5X
- Form factor: Slate
- Dimensions: 148.9 mm (5.86 in) H 76.1 mm (3.00 in) W 9.8 mm (0.39 in) D
- Weight: 155 g (5 oz) (0.342 lb)
- Operating system: Original: Android 5.1.1 "Lollipop"; Last: Android 7.0 "Nougat"
- System-on-chip: Qualcomm Snapdragon 808
- CPU: Hexa-core 64-bit 20 nm • Dual-core 1.82 GHz Cortex A57 • Quad-core 1.44 GHz Cortex A53
- GPU: Adreno 418
- Memory: 3 GB LPDDR3 RAM
- Storage: 32 GB
- Removable storage: microSDXC up to 2 TB
- Battery: 3000 mAh Li-ion
- Rear camera: 16 MP OIS 2.0, f/1.8 aperture, 1/2.6 in sensor, LED flash, Hybrid infrared autofocus, Sony Exmor RS IMX234
- Front camera: 8 MP, Toshiba T4KA3 f/2.0 aperture
- Display: 5.5 in (140 mm) 2560×1440 1440p (534 ppi) IPS LCD
- Sound: Mono speaker, 3.5 mm stereo audio jack
- Connectivity: List: • GSM/HSPA/LTE/4G; • Wi-Fi 802.11a/b/g/n/ac (2.4/5GHz); • Wi-Fi Hotspot; • Wi-Fi Direct; • Infrared blaster; • Bluetooth 4.1 LE (aptX); • NFC; • DLNA; • GPS (GPS-A, Glonass); • Miracast; • USB 2.0 (Micro-B); • 4K SlimPort
- Data inputs: List: Dual microphone; 3-axis gyroscope; 3-axis accelerometer proximity sensor; Ambient light sensor; Multi-touch touchscreen display; Compass
- Model: LG H810 (AT&T); LG H811 (T-Mobile); LG H815 (international); LG H815T (Hong Kong); LG H818 (Dual SIM); LG H819 (China); LG VS986 (Verizon); LG LS991 (Sprint); LG US991 (US Cellular)
- SAR: List: Europe, Middle East, Africa, Asia & Oceania (10 g) • Head: 0.618 W/kg • Body (at 15 mm): 0.460 W/kg; Taiwan (10 g) • Head: 0.621 W/kg; USA & Canada (1 g) • Head: 0.72 W/kg • Body (at 10 mm): 1.18 W/kg
- Website: http://www.lg.com/us/mobile-phones/g4

The LG G4 is an Android smartphone developed by LG Electronics as part of the LG G series. Unveiled on 28 April 2015 and first released in South Korea on 29 April 2015 and widely released in June 2015, as the successor to 2014's G3. The G4 is primarily an evolution of the G3, with revisions to its overall design, display and camera.

The G4 received mixed to positive reviews; while praising the G4's display quality, camera, and overall performance, critics characterized the G4 as being a robust device that did not contain enough substantial changes or innovation over its predecessor to make the device stand out against its major competitors, but could appeal to power users needing a smartphone with expandable storage and a removable battery due to the exclusion of these features from its main competitor on launch, the Samsung Galaxy S6.

The device also became the subject of criticism due to instances of hardware failure caused by manufacturing defects, deemed "bootloops", which culminated in a class-action lawsuit filed in March 2017.

== Specifications ==
=== Hardware ===
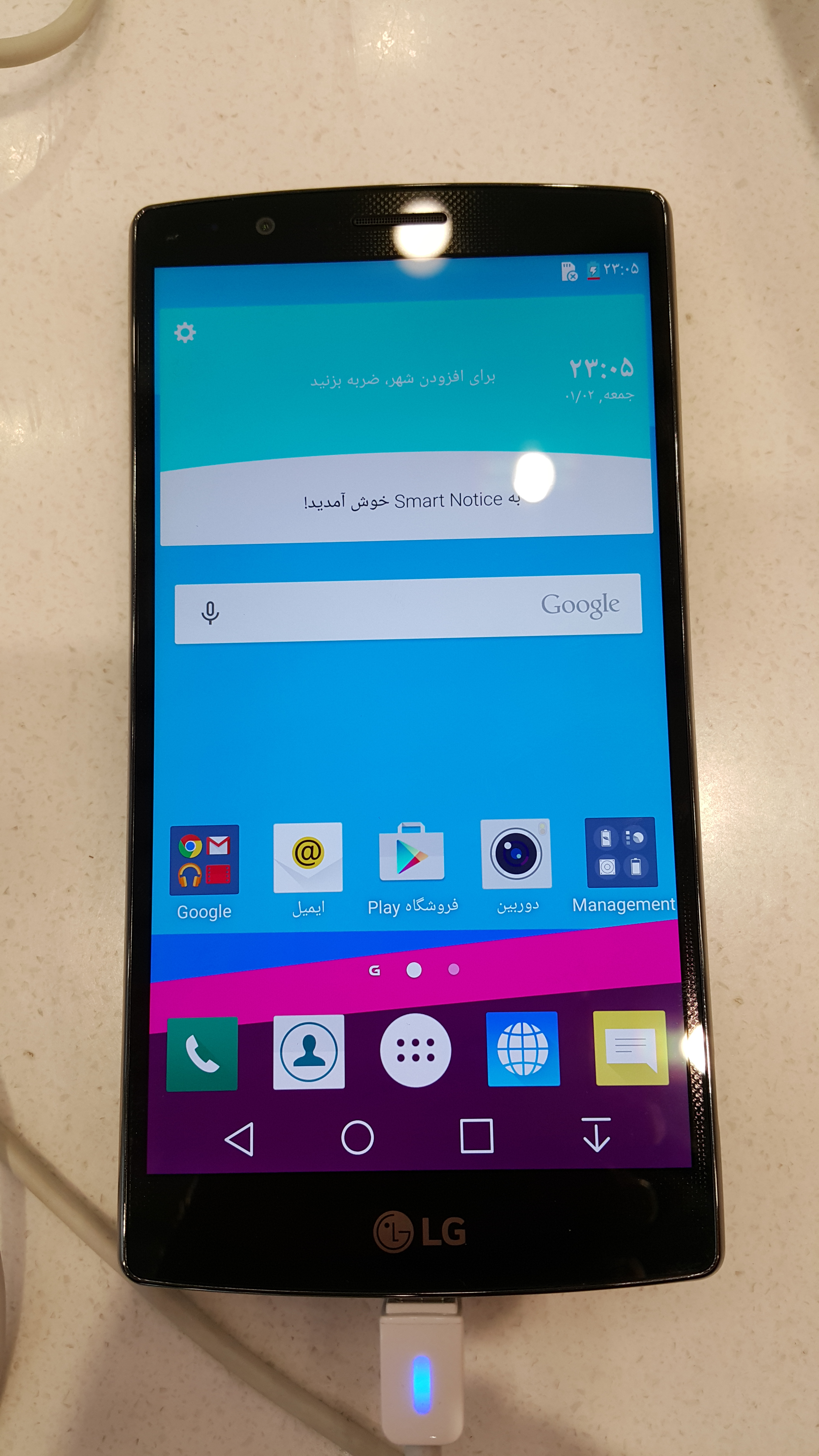
The LG G4 Display

==== Design ====
The design of the G4 is an evolution of the G3, maintaining elements such as its rear-located volume and camera buttons. Several back cover options are available, including plastic covers with a diamond pattern and plastic covers coated in leather, stitched down the middle. Six leather color options are available.

==== Display, chipsets, battery ====
The G4 features a 5.5 in (140 mm), 1440p "Quantum IPS" display, which LG stated would provide better contrast, color accuracy and energy efficiency over another display that LG did not explicitly specify. The G4 utilizes a hexa-core Snapdragon 808 with 3 GB of RAM, consisting of four low-power Cortex-A53 cores and two Cortex-A57 cores.

The G4 includes a removable 3000 mAh battery and supports Qualcomm Quick Charge 2.0 technology with a compatible AC adapter, which is not included. The G4 comes with 32 GB of storage with the option to expand the amount of available storage with a microSD card up to 2 TB in size.

==== Camera ====
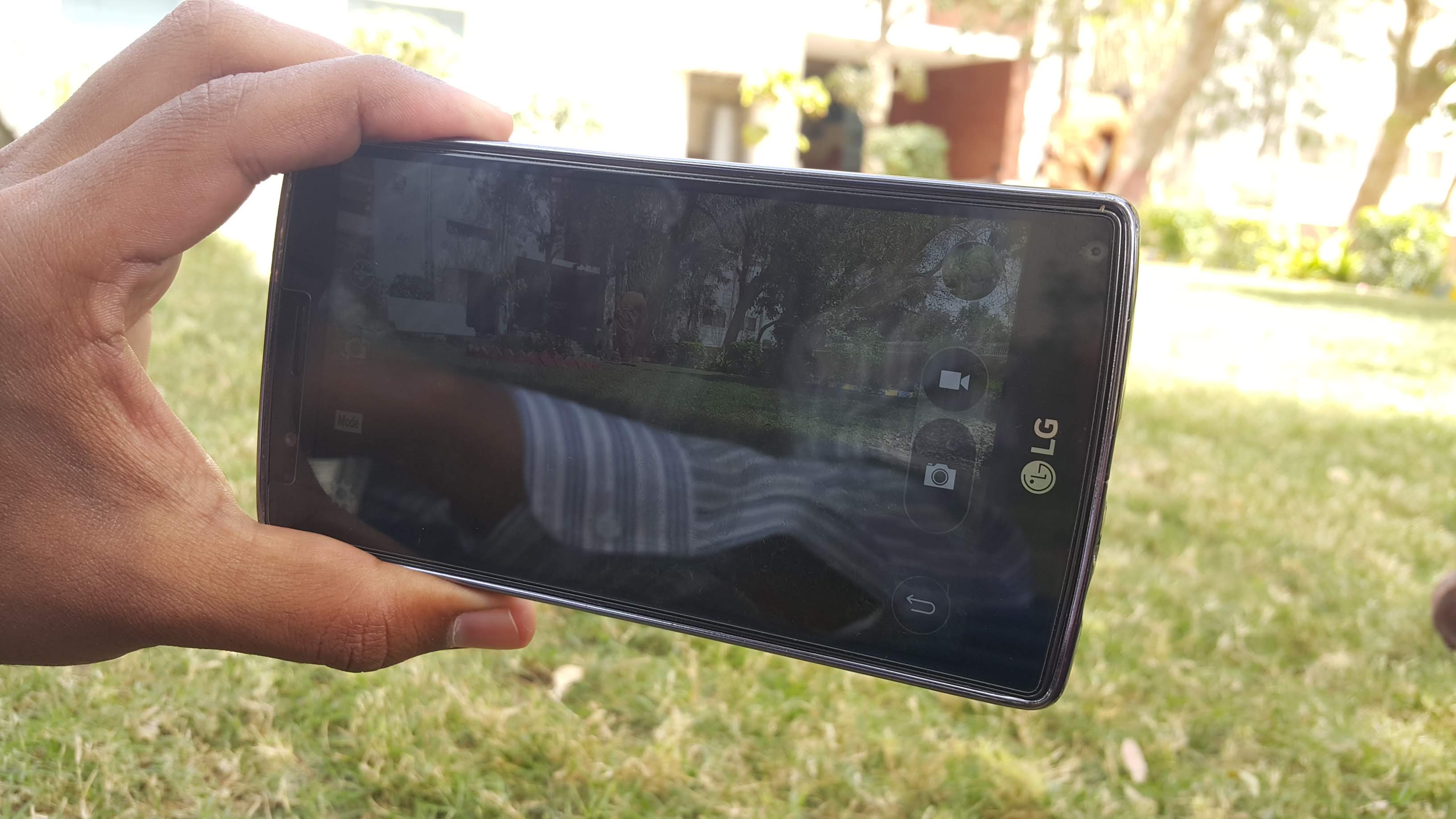
Camera mode on

The rear-facing camera has a 16-megapixel sensor with a f/1.8 aperture lens, infrared active autofocus (by way of a time-of-flight sensor), three-axis optical image stabilization, and LED flash. A "RGB color spectrum sensor" is located below the flash, which analyzes ambient lighting to optimize the white balance and flash color to generate more natural-looking images. The front-facing camera is 8-megapixels with an aperture of f/2.0.

While main camera is able to record video at 2160p (4K) with 30 fps and 720p (HD) with 120 fps, 1080p (Full HD) is unconventionally limited to 30 fps, rather than 60 fps, as from competing mobile phones such as the Samsung Galaxy S6, the HTC One M9 and the iPhone 6.

=== Software ===
The G4 is supplied with Android 5.1 "Lollipop", although the overall user experience is relatively similar to that of the G3. The camera software was upgraded with raw image support, along with a new manual mode offering the ability to adjust the focus, shutter speed, ISO and white balance. Optionally, a photo can be taken automatically by double-clicking the lower volume button when the screen is off. The "Glance View" feature allows users to view notifications when the display is off by dragging down.

On October 14, 2015, LG announced that the G4 would be upgraded to Android 6.0 "Marshmallow", with its release beginning in Poland the following week. followed by releases in other European countries, South Korea, and in the U.S. on Sprint. It enables new features such as "Google Now on Tap", which allows users to perform searches within the context of information currently being displayed on-screen, and "Doze", which optimizes battery usage when the device is not being physically handled. By February 2016, it had reached wider distribution, such as in Canada. Android 7.0 "Nougat" became available for selected models in July 2017.

== Reception ==
The G4 was met with mixed to positive reception from critics. The Verge felt that the G4 could appeal to power users alienated by the removal of expandable storage and replaceable batteries on the then-recently released Samsung Galaxy S6. The display was praised for its improved color accuracy and energy efficiency over the G3, remarking that it was "as good, if not better", than the S6. The G4's rear camera was praised for its quality and color reproduction, along with its "comprehensive" manual mode and its "uncommon" ability to save raw images, but it was noted that its autofocus sometimes missed focus or took long to achieve focus, and that the manual mode did not offer saturation or sharpness controls. LG's software was criticized for being relatively unchanged from the G3, and for suffering from feature creep and "ugly" aesthetics. The G4 given a 7.9 out of 10, concluding that it "actually functions just fine — but you're not going to see it in the hands of every person at the state fair this summer."

The performance of the LG G4 was contrasted to devices that utilize Qualcomm's Snapdragon 810 (such as the LG G Flex 2), which was known to have overheating problems. Ars Technica felt that the need to throttle CPU-intensive tasks to prevent overheating had a negative effect on the 810's performance, arguing that as a result, the G4's Snapdragon 808 performed better in some cases than the 810 (represented in comparison testing by the HTC One M9), but that the Exynos processor of the Galaxy S6 had better overall performance than the two Snapdragon chips on benchmarks. Considering its camera to be the best part of the device, Ars Technica concluded that the G4 was "a perfectly competent smartphone, but doesn't really stand out much."

=== Technical problems ===
==== Touchscreen problems ====
Some users reported inconsistencies in the performance of the G4's touchscreen, with some units—particularly U.S. T-Mobile and Verizon variants—having problems registering quick taps and swipes. LG released an update to fix the problem in its keyboard app in June 2015, followed by Verizon releasing a major OTA update in November 2015 to fix the touchscreen problems and address other problems with the device.

==== "Bootloop" hardware failure ====
In January 2016, LG confirmed that some G4 units had a manufacturing defect that eventually caused them to enter an unrecoverable reboot loop, resulting from "loose contact between components". The company stated that it would repair or replace affected devices under warranty at no charge.

In March 2017, a class-action lawsuit was filed against LG Electronics in the U.S. state of California, alleging that despite acknowledging its existence, LG continued to produce units of the G4 and its sister model, the V10, with the defect, and distributed phones that could succumb to the defects as warranty replacements. The lawsuit stated that LG did not recall or "offer an adequate remedy to consumers" who bought the two models, nor provide any remedy for devices that fell outside of the one-year warranty period. The lawsuit was never certified as a class action, and was sent to arbitration. In January 2018, LG agreed to pay the participants in the lawsuit a $700 credit towards the purchase of a LG smartphone or $425. Since the lawsuit was not certified as a class action, consumers not actually participating in the lawsuit did not receive any payment.

== See also ==
Preceded by LG G3	LG G4; 2015	Succeeded by LG G5
