= LG V60 ThinQ =

2020 Android phablet manufactured by LG Electronics

LG V60 ThinQ 5G
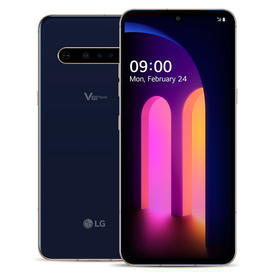
- Brand: LG Electronics
- Manufacturer: LG Electronics
- Type: Phablet
- Series: V series
- First released: 20 March 2020; 6 years ago
- Discontinued: April 5, 2021
- Predecessor: LG V50 ThinQ; LG V30+ (Japan)
- Related: LG Velvet
- Compatible networks: 2G GSM/GPRS/EDGE – 850, 900, 1800, 1900 MHz; 2G CDMA 1xRTT – 800, 1900 MHz; 3G UMTS/HSDPA/HSUPA/HSPA+ – 850, 900, AWS (1700), 1900, 2000, 2100 MHz; 4G LTE – Bands 2, 4, 5, 12, 25, 26, 41, 46, 48, 66, 71 (US, except LG V60 ThinQ 5G UW) 2, 3, 4, 5, 7, 12, 13, 20, 28, 46, 48, 66 (Other Models); 5G SA/NSA/Sub6 – Bands n2, n25, n41, n66, n71 (LG V60 ThinQ 5G) n260, n261, mmWave (LG V60 ThinQ 5G UW)
- Form factor: Slate
- Dimensions: 169.3 mm (6.67 in) H 77.6 mm (3.06 in) W 8.9 mm (0.35 in) D
- Weight: 213–218 g (7.5–7.7 oz)
- Operating system: Original: Android 10 with LG UX; Current: Android 13 with LG UX
- System-on-chip: Qualcomm Snapdragon 865
- CPU: Octa-core (1x 2.84 GHz Gold Prime, 3x 2.42 GHz Gold, 4x 1.8 GHz Silver) Kryo 585
- GPU: Adreno 650
- Memory: 8 GB RAM (128GB Model) & (256GB Model)
- Storage: 128 or 256 or 512 GB UFS 3.0
- Removable storage: microSDXC, expandable up to 2 TB
- Battery: Non-removable Li-po 5000mAh
- Rear camera: 64MP Standard, 27mm, f/1.8, 1/1.72", 0.8 μm, 78˚, OIS, dual pixel (binning) PDAF 13MP Super Wide, 12mm, f/1.9, 1/3.4", 1.0 μm, 117˚, no Auto Focus 0.3MP ToF 3D, f/1.4 (depth)
- Front camera: 10MP Standard, 30mm, f/1.9, 1/3.1", 1.22 μm, 72.5˚
- Display: 6.8", 1080x2460 (2.6 MP), P-OLED, 20.5:9, 395ppi
- Sound: Stereo speaker 3.5mm headphone jack 32-bit/384kHz audio (ESS Sabre ES9219); 24-bit/48kHz audio recording Active noise cancellation with dedicated mic DTS: X Surround Sound
- Connectivity: Wi-Fi 802.11a/b/g/n/ac/ax (2.4 & 5GHz), Bluetooth 5.1 with aptX, 4G/LTE, 5G
- Other: Stereo Speaker,4Ch Microphones, AI CAM, Google Lens, 32-bit Hi-Fi Quad DAC, LG 3D Sound Engine, HDR10+, Qualcomm Quick Charge™ 4+, MIL-STD 810G Compliance, IP68 Water and Dust Resistance, LG Pay, FM Radio
- Website: www.lg.com/us/mobile-phones/v60-thinq-dual-screen

The LG V60 ThinQ 5G, commonly referred to as the LG V60, is an Android phablet smartphone manufactured by LG Electronics as part of the LG V series. It was announced in February 2020 and is the successor to the LG V50 ThinQ. On April 5, 2021, LG announced it would be shutting down its mobile phone division and ceasing production of all remaining devices. LG noted the phone would be available until existing inventory ran out.

== Specifications ==
=== Design and Hardware ===
Anodized aluminum is used for the frame, however the edges are chamfered unlike the V50. Gorilla Glass 5 is present on the front, while Gorilla Glass 6 is on the back. The camera module protrudes slightly from the back like on the V40, and the flash is no longer separate, while the rear-mounted fingerprint sensor has been replaced with an under-screen optical unit. On the front, the dual cameras of the V40 and V50 have been omitted in favor of a singular autofocusing front-facing camera, which reduces the size of the display notch. The V60 is available in Classy Blue or Classy White; the IP68 rating is retained. The device uses the Snapdragon 865 processor with the Adreno 650 GPU, and supports 5G. It is available with 8 GB of LPDDR5 RAM and 128 GB or 256 GB of UFS 3.0 storage. MicroSD card expansion is supported through a hybrid single-SIM slot, up to 2 TB with a single-SIM. The P-OLED display is larger than the V50's at 6.8 inches (172.7 mm) and has a wider 20.5:9 aspect ratio, but the resolution has been lowered to 1080p from 1440p. The display supports Wacom AES active pen input, but no pen is included and there is no built in storage for one. To compete with folding smartphones, the device offers a case accessory known as "LG DualScreen", which contains a second, 6.8-inch 1080p display panel. It is connected and powered through the USB type-C connector of the phone, and also supports active pen input. While the DualScreen is being used, the phone can still be charged wired with an included magnetic charging tip. Stereo speakers are present with active noise cancellation and a 3.5 mm audio jack. The battery is larger at 5000 mAh, and can be recharged either wired over USB-C (Quick Charge 4.0+) or wirelessly (Qi). A triple camera setup is used on the rear, consisting of a 64 MP Samsung's Bright S5KGW1 main sensor, a 13 MP ultrawide sensor and a time-of-flight 3D depth sensor. There is no telephoto sensor like on the V40 and V50; LG claimed that the high resolution of the wide sensor can shoot lossless zoom photos, which was not the case in real life. The rear camera can now record video at 8K resolution at 26 fps, encoded at 10 bit HDR10+ format in Rec.2020 colour space. The front-facing camera is 10 MP and can now record 4K video at 60 frames per second.

=== Software ===
The V60 ships with Android 10 and uses LG's UX 9.
