= LG W10 =

2019 smartphone model

- Brand: LG
- Manufacturer: LG Electronics
- Series: LG W series
- First released: July 2019
- Availability by region: Discontinued
- Related: LG W30; LG W30 Pro
- Compatible networks: GSM, HSPA, LTE
- Form factor: Slate
- Dimensions: 156 mm × 76.2 mm × 8.5 mm (6.14 in × 3.00 in × 0.33 in)
- Weight: 164 g (5.8 oz)
- Operating system: Android 9.0 (Pie)
- System-on-chip: MediaTek MT6762 Helio P22 (12 nm)
- CPU: Octa-core 2.0 GHz Cortex-A53
- GPU: PowerVR GE8320
- Memory: 3 GB RAM
- Storage: 32 GB eMMC 5.1
- Removable storage: microSDXC (dedicated slot)
- Battery: Non-removable Li-Po 4000 mAh
- Rear camera: Dual: * 13 MP, PDAF * 5 MP auxiliary lens LED flash, panorama, HDR; Video: 1080p@30fps
- Front camera: 8 MP, LED flash Video: 1080p@30fps
- Display: 6.19 in (157 mm) IPS LCD; 720 x 1512 pixels, 19:9 ratio (~271 ppi density)
- Sound: Loudspeaker, 3.5mm jack
- Connectivity: Wi-Fi 802.11 b/g/n, Wi-Fi Direct; Bluetooth 4.2, A2DP, LE; GPS, GLONASS microUSB 2.0, OTG
- Model: LMX130IM

The LG W10 is an entry-level Android-based smartphone developed and manufactured by LG Electronics, as part of the W series. First unveiled on June 26, 2019, it was released on July 3 in India.

== Specifications ==
=== Hardware ===
The device is driven by a Mediatek MT6762 Helio P22 chipset built on a 12-nanometer process technology. Its internal architecture features an octa-core CPU consisting of eight Cortex-A53 cores clocked at a uniform frequency of 2.0 GHz. Graphics processing is managed by an integrated PowerVR GE8320 GPU. The smartphone is equipped with 3 GB of RAM alongside 32 GB of eMMC 5.1 internal storage. Users can expand the system storage via a dedicated microSDXC card slot. Power is supplied by a non-removable Lithium-Polymer 4000 mAh battery.

=== Display ===
The handset features an IPS LCD touchscreen display that measures 6.19 inches diagonally. This screen occupies approximately 80.7% of the phone's front surface area. It delivers a display resolution of 720 x 1512 pixels set at a 19:9 widescreen aspect ratio. This configuration yields a pixel density calculation of roughly 271 pixels per inch.

=== Camera ===
The primary rear-facing imaging module features a dual-camera setup consisting of a 13-megapixel sensor with Phase Detection Autofocus and a secondary 5-megapixel auxiliary lens. This rear camera configuration is complemented by an LED flash, panorama software, and High Dynamic Range capabilities. Video capture via the main cameras supports recording resolutions up to 1080p at 30 frames per second. For front-facing photography, an 8-megapixel single camera is integrated into the display bezel, complete with its own dedicated LED flash and support for 1080p video recording at 30 frames per second.

=== Connectivity and software ===
The smartphone shipped out of the box running the Android 9.0 Pie operating system. Wireless local area networking is provided through Wi-Fi 802.11 b/g/n and Wi-Fi Direct compatibility.
