= LG Velvet =

2020 Android phablet manufactured by LG Electronics

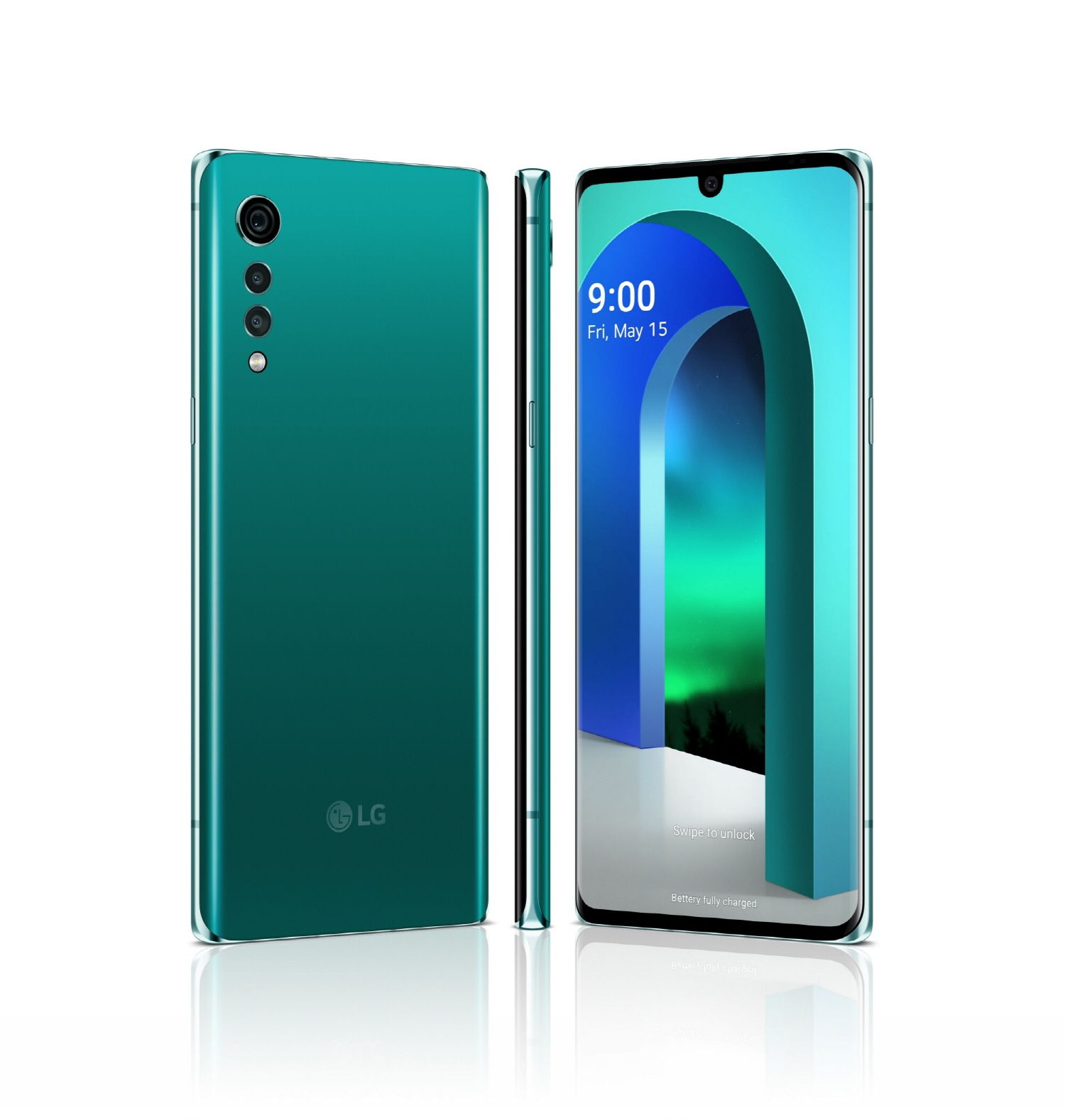
- LG Velvet in Aurora Green
- Brand: LG G series
- Manufacturer: LG Electronics
- Type: Phablet
- Availability by region: South Korea: 15 May 2020; 6 years ago; Europe (5G): 16 June 2020; 6 years ago; United States: 22 July 2020; 5 years ago; Europe (4G): 31 July 2020; 5 years ago; Japan: 18 December 2020; 5 years ago
- Discontinued: April 5, 2021
- Predecessor: LG G8 ThinQ
- Related: LG V60 ThinQ
- Compatible networks: 2G GSM/GPRS/EDGE – 850, 900, 1800, 1900 MHz; 2G CDMA 1xRTT – 800, 1900 MHz; 3G UMTS/HSDPA/HSUPA/HSPA+ – 850, 900, AWS (1700), 1900, 2000, 2100 MHz; 4G LTE; 5G SA/NSA
- Form factor: Slate
- Dimensions: 167.2 mm (6.58 in) H; 74.1 mm (2.92 in) W; 7.9 mm (0.31 in) D
- Weight: 180 g (6.3 oz)
- Operating system: Original: Android 10 with LG UX 10; Current: Android 13 with LG UX
- System-on-chip: 4G: Qualcomm Snapdragon 845; 5G South Korea: Qualcomm Snapdragon 765; 5G Global/Verizon: Qualcomm Snapdragon 765G; 5G T-Mobile: MediaTek Dimensity 1000C
- CPU: Octa-core; 4G: (4x 2.8 GHz Gold, 4x 1.8 GHz Silver) Kryo 385; 5G Global/Verizon: (1x 2.4 GHz Gold Prime, 1x 2.2 GHz Gold, 6x 1.8 GHz Silver) Kryo 475; 5G T-Mobile: (4x 2.0 GHz Cortex-A77, 4x 2.0 GHz Cortex-A55)
- GPU: 4G: Adreno 630; 5G Global/Verizon: Adreno 620; 5G T-Mobile: Mali-G57 MC5
- Memory: 6 or 8 GB RAM
- Storage: 128 GB UFS 2.1
- Removable storage: microSDXC, expandable up to 1 TB
- Battery: Non-removable Li-Po; 4300mAh; 4000mAh (5G T-Mobile)
- Rear camera: 48 MP (wide), f/1.8, 1/2", 0.8µm, OIS, PDAF; 8 MP (ultrawide), f/2.2, 1/4", 1.12µm; 5 MP (depth), f/2.4; LED flash, panorama, HDR, gyro-EIS, 4K, 1080p
- Front camera: 16 MP, f/2.0, 1/3.1", 1.0µm; HDR, 1080p@30fps
- Display: P-OLED capacitive touchscreen, 6.8 in (170 mm) 1080 × 2460 1080p, (41:18 aspect ratio, 395 ppi), 16M colors
- Model: LM-G900, LM-G910; L-52A (Japan; 5G model for NTT Docomo)
- Other: MIL-STD 810G Compliance, IP68 Water and Dust Resistance

The LG Velvet (also unofficially named LG G9) is an Android phablet smartphone manufactured by LG Electronics, announced in May 2020 as a rebrand for the LG G series. The device shares some of its hardware with the flagship V60 ThinQ, with the same display, but a smaller battery and different cameras. On April 5, 2021, LG announced it would be shutting down its mobile phone division and ceasing production of all remaining devices. LG noted the phone would be available until existing inventory ran out.

== Specifications ==
=== Design ===
The Velvet uses an anodized aluminum frame and curved Gorilla Glass on both the front and back, with an IP68 rating for water/dust resistance. A unique vertically-oriented camera setup is on the rear. Instead of being housed in an array, each camera has a separate lens, using a "raindrop effect". The top sensor protrudes slightly, while the other sensors and LED flash are flush with the back panel.

The 4G model is available in Black and Aurora Silver; the 5G model is available in Aurora White, Aurora Green, Aurora Gray and Illusion Sunset. Blue, Red and Pink carrier-exclusive finishes were added later for SK Telecom, KT and LG U+ respectively. The Verizon 5G UW model is only available in Aurora Red.

=== Hardware ===
The 4G model uses the Snapdragon 845 and Adreno 630, while the 5G model uses the Snapdragon 765G and Adreno 620. The T-Mobile 5G model uses the MediaTek Dimensity 1000C and Mali-G57 MC5. The sole storage option is 128 GB of UFS 2.1, paired with 6 or 8 GB of LPDDR4X RAM. MicroSD card expansion is supported through a hybrid dual-SIM slot, up to 1 TB with a single-SIM or dual-SIM setup.

The display uses a curved 6.8 in (170 mm) 1080p P-OLED panel with a 41:18 aspect ratio, with support for LG's DualScreen case accessory. It supports Wacom AES active pen input, but no pen is included and there is no built in storage for one. An under-screen optical fingerprint scanner and facial recognition are used for biometrics like on the V60. The battery capacity is 4300mAh, and can be recharged either wired over USB-C at up to 15 W (4G) / 25 W (5G) or wirelessly via Qi at up to 9 W. A triple camera setup is used on the rear, consisting of a 48 MP wide sensor, an 8 MP ultrawide sensor and a 5 MP macro sensor. The front camera uses a 16 MP sensor and is located in a small cutout at the top of the display.

=== Software ===
The Velvet ships with Android 10 (Quince Tart) and uses LG's UX 9.

== Velvet 2 Pro ==
An updated version called the Velvet 2 Pro was leaked in media. Its exterior changes appear to be limited to touch buttons for volume and power. Due to the discontinuation of LG's phone division, the phone would reportedly only be sold to Korean LG staff at a steeply discounted price.
