= LG V series =

Android-based smartphone

- Developer: LG
- Type: Phablet, Smartphone
- Released: 2015
- Operating system: Android

The LG V series was a line of high-end Android devices produced by LG Electronics. This series is slated above the LG G series. The first phone in the V series, the LG V10, was unveiled in September 2015, the first smartphone to have the multiples of 10. The last in the series is the LG V60 ThinQ released in March 2020.

== Phones ==
=== LG V10 ===
LG announced the V10 smartphone in September 2015. It features a secondary display above the main screen, as well as two 5MP front-facing cameras (the secondary being 120° wide angle). Introducing a fingerprint sensor and home button combination as well as a leather back, it also includes comprehensive manual photo and video modes for advanced and quick editing while on the move.

- Display: 5.7" IPS LCD with 1440x2560 pixel resolution (main); 2.1" display with 160x1040 pixel resolution (secondary)
- Processor: Qualcomm Snapdragon 808
- Storage: 64 GB (expandable)
- RAM: 4 GB LPDDR3
- Sound: Sabre ES9018 32-bit Hi-Fi DAC
- Battery: 3000 mAh (removable)
- Colors: Space Black, Opal Blue

=== LG V20 ===
LG announced the V20 smartphone on September 6, 2016. Like its predecessor, it features a secondary display above the main screen while also being MIL-STD-810G drop compliant with its thin aluminium back. Though no longer having dual front-facing cameras, the LG V20 gains an 8 MP, 135° wide angle secondary rear camera over the V10 while maintaining the less common features such as an IR blaster, FM radio, high fidelity 24-bit dedicated audio recorder and microSD card slot in line with the professional use case of the LG V series.

- Display: 5.7" IPS LCD with 1440x2560 pixel resolution (main); 2.1" display with 160x1040 pixel resolution (secondary)
- Processor: Qualcomm Snapdragon 820
- Storage: 64 GB (expandable)
- RAM: 4 GB LPDDR4
- Sound: Sabre ES9218 32-bit Hi-Fi Quad DAC, tuned by Bang & Olufsen in all regions except North America
- Battery: 3200 mAh (removable)
- Colors: Titan, Pink, Silver

=== LG V30 ===
LG announced the V30 series, consisting of the LG V30 and LG V30+, on August 31, 2017. It forgoes the V20's secondary display for an 18:9 near bezeless screen and forgoes the removable battery in favor of IP68 waterproofing and a wireless charging glass design. Compared to the V20, the second screen was replaced with a software floating bar. The only difference between the standard LG V30 and the LG V30+ is the fact that the LG V30+ has 128 GB of storage, while the LG V30 has 64 GB.

- Display: 6" 18:9 POLED with 1440×2880 pixel resolution, DCI-P3 FullVision
- Processor: Qualcomm Snapdragon 835
- Storage: 64 GB (LG V30); 128 GB (LG V30+); both are expandable
- RAM: 4 GB LPDDR4X
- Sound: Sabre ES9218P 32-bit Hi-Fi Quad DAC, tuned by Bang & Olufsen
- Battery: 3300 mAh (non-removable)
- Colors: Aurora Black, Cloud Silver, Moroccan Blue, Lavender Violet, and Raspberry Rose

=== LG V30S ThinQ ===
In February 2018, LG announced an update to the LG V30, the LG V30S ThinQ, which marks the first phone with the ThinQ branding. The phone's hardware is similar to that of the LG V30, with the main differences being in storage, RAM, and color options. The LG V30S ThinQ also contains a number of new software features.

- Processor: Qualcomm Snapdragon 835
- Storage: 128 GB (LG V30S); 256 GB (LG V30S+); both are expandable
- RAM: 6 GB
- Battery: 3300 mAh (non-removable)
- Colors: New Platinum Grey and New Moroccan Blue

=== LG V35 ThinQ ===
A new addition to the LG V30 series, the LG V35 ThinQ was released in May 2018. The phone contains most of the build and design of the LG V30 with the addition of upgraded hardware, listed below:

- Processor: Qualcomm Snapdragon 845
- Storage: 64 GB; expandable
- RAM: 6 GB
- Battery: 3300 mAh (non-removable)
- Camera - Front: 8 MP, f/1.9 (versus 5 MP, f/2.2 on the LG V30S)
- Camera - Rear: 16 MP 107° secondary wide angle, f/1.9 (versus 13 MP 120° secondary wide angle, f/1.9 on the LG V30S)
- Sound: Same ESS Technology Hi-Fi DAC as the V30S plus the inclusion of DTS:X 3D Surround Sound software option
- Colors: Aurora Black, Platinum Grey

=== LG V40 ThinQ ===
On September 27, 2018, LG Mobile Global posted on their YouTube Channel about the design video teaser of the upcoming LG V40 ThinQ. The teaser teased with the phrase "Take 5", hinting that the phone will have 5 cameras altogether (a first for LG), a soft, silky feel ("Silky Blast"), and a selection of colors like Moroccan Blue and Aurora Black. On October 3, 2018, LG officially announced the LG V40 ThinQ in New York City alongside the LG Watch W7 hybrid watch. This phone released on October 18, 2018.

The dual selfie cameras, a feature introduced on the V10, return on the V40 ThinQ, and are housed within the "notch".

Key Specifications

- OS: Android 8.1 (Oreo)
- Display: 6.4" 19.5:9 QHD+ OLED FullVision (3120 x 1440 resolution / 538ppi / HDR10)
- Processor: Qualcomm Snapdragon 845 Octa-Core processor
- Storage: 128GB (expandable up to 2TB)
- RAM: 6GB LPDDR4X
- Network: LTE-A 4 Band CA
- Connectivity: Wi-Fi 802.11a/b/g/n/ac, Bluetooth 5.0 BLE, NFC, USB Type-C 2.0 (3.1 compatible)
- Sound: Sabre ES9218P 32-bit Hi-Fi Quad DAC, smartphone speakers tuned by Meridian Audio, Boombox Speaker, DTS:X 3D Surround Sound
- Battery: 3300mAh (non-removable)
- Colors: New Moroccan Blue, New Aurora Black, New Platinum Gray, Carmine Red
- Build protection: MIL-STD 810 drop compliant, IP68 dust and water resistant

Photography

- Three rear cameras
  - 16 MP super wide-angle (f1.9 / 1.0 μm / 107°)
  - 12 MP standard angle (f1.5 / 1.4 μm / 78°)
  - 12 MP telephoto zoom (f2.4 / 1.0 μm / 45°)
- Two front cameras
  - 8 MP standard angle (f1.9 / 1.12 μm / 80°)
  - 5 MP wide-angle (f2.2 / 1.12 μm / 90°)
  - Front cameras can work in tandem to create the perfect bokeh effect with an on-screen slider to adjust the amount of background blur. Other features allow selfie lovers to personalize their photos even more with unique lighting and special effects.
- Camera modes:
  - Triple Shot: Easily capture three photos - standard, telephoto zoom, and super wide-angle - with just one click.
  - Cine Shot: Control what moves. Transform your snapshots into "living" photos that grab and hold attention.
  - AI Assistant: ThinQ AI recognizes what you're shooting and suggest the best filter, while AI composition adjusts the position of your subject for artistically balanced photos.
  - 3D Light Effect: Changes the tone of a photo with professional-looking lighting, touch up any selfie with different looks using Makeup Pro.
  - Custom Backdrop: Entirely change the background of a selfie.
  - AR Emoji and Avatars: For those who love all things augmented reality, create and share personalized emojis using one's own face or one of the provided characters.

=== LG V50-V50s ThinQ ===
LG announced the V50 ThinQ on 24 February 2019 and the V50s in October 2019 at MWC 2019. The V50-S is largely identical to the V40 externally, albeit with a flush rear camera similarly to the LG G8 and a 5G logo. It features a Qualcomm Snapdragon 855 system-on-chip and Adreno 640 GPU, as well as 5G support and a slightly larger battery. To compete with folding smartphones, the device offers a case accessory known as "LG DualScreen", which contains a second, 6.2-inch 1080p display panel. It is powered using pogo pin connectors on the phone, but communicates wirelessly.

== Comparison ==
Model	V10	V20	V30 & V30S ThinQ	V35 ThinQ	V40 ThinQ	V50 ThinQ	V60 ThinQ
Date Released	8 October 2015	29 September 2016	21 September 2017	May 2018	3 October 2018	10 May 2019	20 March 2020
Image							
Android OS version	5.1.1 Lollipop	7.0 Nougat	7.1.2 Nougat; 8.0 Oreo (V30S)	8.0 Oreo	8.1 Oreo	9.0 Pie	Android 10
Upgradable to	7.0 Nougat (some variants)	8.0 Oreo	9.0 Pie			Android 12	Android 13
Dimensions (H×W×D)	159.6 mm × 79.3 mm × 8.6 mm 6.28 in × 3.12 in × 0.34 in	159.7 mm × 78.1 mm × 7.6 mm 6.29 in × 3.07 in × 0.30 in	151.7 mm × 75.4 mm × 7.3 mm 5.97 in × 2.97 in × 0.29 in		158.8 mm × 75.7 mm × 7.6 mm 6.25 in × 2.98 in × 0.30 in	159.1 mm × 76.1 mm × 8.3 mm 6.26 in × 3.00 in × 0.33 in	169.3 mm × 77.6 mm × 8.9 mm 6.67 in × 3.06 in × 0.35 in
Weight	192 g (6.8 oz)	174 g (6.1 oz)	158 g (5.6 oz)	157 g (5.5 oz)	169 g (6.0 oz)	183 g (6.5 oz)	218 g (7.7 oz)
Chipset	Qualcomm Snapdragon 808	Qualcomm Snapdragon 820	Qualcomm Snapdragon 835	Qualcomm Snapdragon 845		Qualcomm Snapdragon 855	Qualcomm Snapdragon 865
CPU	1.82 GHz and 1.44 GHz hexa core 64-bit Cortex-A53/57 MSM8992 ARMv8 (20 nm)	2.15 GHz and 1.6 GHz quad core 64-bit Kryo MSM8996 ARMv8 (14 nm)	2.45 GHz and 1.9 GHz octa core 64-bit Kryo MSM8998 ARMv8 (10 nm)	2.8 GHz and 1.7 GHz octa core 64-bit Kryo 385 Gold/Silver SDM845 ARMv8 (10 nm)		2.84 GHz, 2.42 GHz and 1.8 GHz octa core 64-bit Kryo 485 SDM855 ARMv8 (7 nm)	2.84 GHz, 2.42 GHz and 1.8 GHz octa core 64-bit Kryo 585 SDM655 ARMv8 (7 nm+)
GPU	Adreno 418	Adreno 530	Adreno 540	Adreno 630		Adreno 640	Adreno 650
RAM	4 GB LPDDR3	4 GB LPDDR4	4 GB	6 GB			8 GB LPDDR5
Storage	32 GB or 64 GB	64 GB	64 GB; 128 GB (+ model)		128 GB		128 GB or 256 GB
Memory Card	microSD, up to 256 GB	microSD, up to 512 GB					
Wireless Connectivity	A-GPS/GLONASS; Bluetooth 4.1; Wi-Fi IEEE 802.11a/b/g/n/ac NFC	A-GPS/GLONASS; Bluetooth 4.2; Wi-Fi IEEE 802.11a/b/g/n/ac NFC	A-GPS/GLONASS; Bluetooth 5.0; Wi-Fi IEEE 802.11a/b/g/n/ac NFC				A-GPS/GLONASS; Bluetooth 5.1; Wi-Fi IEEE 802.11a/b/g/n/ac/ax NFC
Battery	3,000 mAh, removable	3,200 mAh, removable	3,300 mAh			4,000 mAh	5,000 mAh
Materials	stainless steel frame, Gorilla Glass 4, plastic cover	aluminium chassis, Gorilla Glass 4, plastic end-caps	aluminium frame, Gorilla Glass 5, glass back				
Ports and Audio	micro-USB 2.0; 3.5 mm headphone jack, powered by ESS Sabre 9018 DAC, Sabre 9602 headphone amp	2.0, USB-C 1.0; 3.5 mm headphone jack, powered by ESS Sabre ES9218 DAC with integrated headphone amp	3.1, USB-C 1.0; 3.5 mm headphone jack, powered by ESS Sabre ES9128P DAC with integrated headphone amp				3.1, USB-C 1.0; 3.5 mm headphone jack, powered by ESS Sabre ES9219 DAC with integrated headphone amp
Display	5.7 in (140 mm) IPS LCD; 1440×2560 px (515 ppi); 9:16 aspect ratio 2.1 in (53 mm) IPS LCD; 160×1040 px (501 ppi); 2:13 aspect ratio (secondary display)		6.0 in (150 mm) P-OLED; 1440×2880 px (537 ppi); 9:18 aspect ratio		6.4 in (160 mm) AMOLED; 1440×3120 px (537 ppi); 9:19.5 aspect ratio		6.8 in (170 mm) P-OLED; 1080×2460 px (395 ppi); 9:20.5 aspect ratio
Rear Camera(s)	16 MP (4920×3264)	16 MP (4920×3264) + wide-angle 8 MP (3264x2448)	Sony Exmor IMX351, 16 MP (4920×3264) + wide-angle 13 MP (4128×3096) (4:3 aspect ratio)	Sony Exmor IMX351, 16 MP (4920×3264) + wide-angle 16 MP (4920×3264)	12 MP (4000×3000) (4:3 aspect ratio) + wide-angle 16 MP (4920×3264) + telephoto 12 MP (4000×3000) (4:3 aspect ratio)		64 MP (9248×6936) (4:3 aspect ratio) + wide-angle 13 MP (4128×3096) (4:3 aspect ratio) + ToF 0.3 MP
Lens	f/1.8, 1/2.6"	wide: f/1.8, 1/2.6", 29mm; ultra-wide: f/2.4, 1/3.2", 12mm	wide: f/1.6, 1.0 μm, 30mm; ultra-wide: f/1.9, 12mm	wide: f/1.6, 1/3.1", 1.0 μm, 30mm; ultra-wide: f/1.9, 1/3.1", 1.0 μm, 16mm	wide: f/1.5, 1/2.6", 1.4 μm, 27mm; ultra-wide: f/1.9, 1/3.1", 1.0 μm, 16mm; telephoto: f/2.4, 1.0 μm, 52mm		wide: f/1.8, 1/1.72", 0.8 μm, 27mm; ultra-wide: f/1.9, 1/3.4", 1.0 μm, 12mm; ToF: f/1.4
Video	4K30, 1080p30 or 720p120		4K30, 1080p60, 1080p30 or 720p120	4K30, 1080p60, 1080p30 or 720p240	4K60, 4K30, 1080p240, 1080p60 or 1080p30		8K30, 4K60, 4K30, 1080p
features	OIS, Laser AF		OIS, Laser AF, PDAF		OIS, PDAF		
Front Camera(s)	dual 5 MP (2560x1960), 4:3 aspect ratio		5 MP (2560x1960), 4:3 aspect ratio	8 MP (3264x2448), 4:3 aspect ratio	8 MP (3264x2448), 4:3 aspect ratio + 5 MP (2560x1960), 4:3 aspect ratio		10 MP, 4:3 aspect ratio
Lens	main: f/2.0, 80°; secondary: f/2.2, 120°	main: f/1.9, 83°; secondary: f/?, 120°	f/2.2, 1/5", 1.12 μm, 22mm	f/1.9, 1/5", 1.12 μm, 22mm	main: f/1.9, 1.4 μm, 26mm; secondary: f/2.2, 1.4 μm, 21mm		f/1.9, 1/3.1", 1.22 μm, 30mm
Video	1080p?		1080p30				4K30
SIM card format	Nano-SIM						
Colors	Space Black; Luxe White; Modern Beige; Ocean Blue; Opal Blue	Titan; Silver; Pink	Aurora Black; Cloud Silver; Moroccan Blue; Lavender Violet; Raspberry Rose; New Moroccan Blue; New Platinum Gray (V30S)	New Aurora Black; New Platinum Gray	New Moroccan Blue; New Platinum Gray; New Aurora Black; Carmine Red	New Aurora Black	Classy Blue; Classy White
References							

== See also ==
- LG G series
- LG Q series
- LG K series
