= LG V10 =

Android smartphone manufactured by LG Electronics

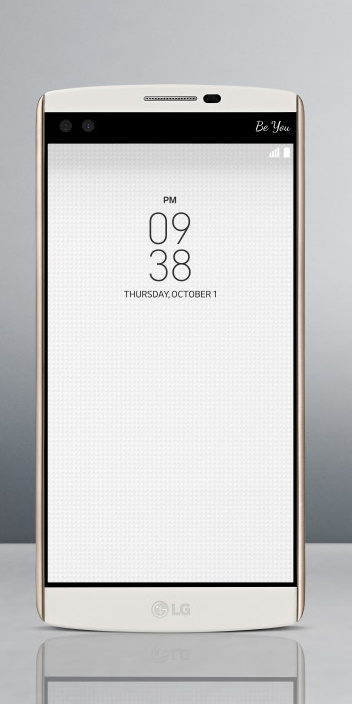
- Brand: LG Electronics
- Manufacturer: LG Electronics
- Type: Phablet
- Series: V series
- First released: October 8, 2015; 10 years ago
- Predecessor: LG Vu 3, LG G Pro 2
- Successor: LG V20
- Related: LG G4
- Form factor: Slate
- Dimensions: 159.6 mm (6.28 in) H 79.3 mm (3.12 in) W 8.6 mm (0.34 in) D
- Weight: 192 g (6.8 oz)
- Operating system: Original: Android 5.1.1 "Lollipop"; Current: Android 7.0 "Nougat" (some variants)
- System-on-chip: Qualcomm Snapdragon 808
- CPU: Hexa-core 64-bit 20 nm • Dual-core 1.82 GHz Cortex A57 • Quad-core 1.44 GHz Cortex A53
- GPU: Adreno 418
- Memory: 4 GB LPDDR3 RAM
- Storage: 32 or 64 GB
- Removable storage: microSDXC up to 2 TB
- Battery: 3000 mAh, removable
- Rear camera: 16 MP OIS 2.0, f/1.8 aperture, LED flash, hybrid infrared autofocus
- Front camera: Dual 5 MP, f/2.0 aperture 80°, or f/2.2 120° wide-angle
- Display: 5.7 in (140 mm) 2560×1440 1440p (515 ppi) IPS LCD; Secondary display 2.1 in (53 mm) 160×1040
- Sound: Mono speaker, 3.5 mm stereo audio jack
- Connectivity: List: GSM/HSPA/LTE/4G; Wi-Fi 802.11a/b/g/n/ac (2.4/5 GHz); Wi-Fi Hotspot; Wi-Fi Direct; Infrared blaster; Bluetooth 4.1 LE (aptX); NFC; DLNA; GPS (GPS-A, Glonass); Miracast; USB 2.0 (Micro-B); 4K SlimPort; Fingerprint sensor; MIL-STD-810G shock resistant
- Data inputs: List: Triple microphone; 3-axis gyroscope; 3-axis accelerometer proximity sensor; Ambient light sensor; Multi-touch touchscreen display; Compass
- Model: H900(AT&T), H901(T-Mobile USA), H960, F600S/K/L(SK Telecom/kt/LG U+) VS990(Verizon); Dual SIM: H961N, H961S, H962, H968
- SAR: List: Europe, Middle East, Africa, Asia & Oceania (10 g) • Head: 0.590 W/kg • Body (at 15 mm): 0.297 W/kg; Taiwan (10 g) • Head: 0.340 W/kg
- Website: http://www.lg.com/us/mobile-phones/v10

The LG V10 is an Android phablet smartphone manufactured by LG Electronics as part of the LG V series. Announced in September 2015 and released in October 2015, the device shares many similarities with the earlier LG G4. Its main feature is a customizable second display above the primary display, which, among other uses, shows notifications and music controls without waking up the primary display. In 2016, its successor, the LG V20 was released. Despite its innovative design, the V10 faced criticism for durability issues, including reports of bootloop failures and screen detachment over time.

== Hardware ==
=== General ===
The V10 uses the same camera and many of the same specifications as the LG G4. The phone has a 2560x1440 Quantum IPS display, a silicone back with a user-replaceable 3000 mAh battery and MicroSD card expansion, a six core Qualcomm Snapdragon 808 processor which sports a big.LITTLE architecture similar to the 810, and 4GB of LPDDR3 933 MHz RAM.

The phone supports Qualcomm's Quick Charge 2.0 technology via USB and Qi wireless charging via the optional CPR-120 wireless charging cover.

=== Design ===
The LG V10 is designed with physical robustness in mind, complying to the MIL-STD-810G standard. The screen is 5.7", as well as having a screen width of 2.57 millimeters thick. The phone has a stainless steel sides and a silicone skinned back. LG's "Dura Skin" and "Dura Guard" design provides structural integrity and protection to drops and falls. The screen is made with Gorilla Glass 4. The phone weighs 192 grams in total.

== Camera details ==
The camera features the Sony Exmor IMX240 image sensor has 16 megapixels, 2160p (4K) video recording, a f/1.8 aperture, laser autofocus and includes optical image stabilization with manual DSLR-like modes for video and still shots. There are two front 5 megapixel cameras for widescreen “groupies” (group portraits).

Although the LG V10 features the same camera hardware as the LG G4, the camera software is more sophisticated and richer in functionality that includes RAW photography and manual camera parameter settings (exposure, ISO, exposure value, manual focus) for both photos and videos.

An additional feature called “rear curtain sync” allows firing the camera flash at the end of the exposure time instead of the beginning, which supposedly prevents the overexposure of closer subjects.

In manual video mode, the LG V10 allows setting the framerate to levels between 1 and 120 frames per second, of which the highest available framerate depends on the selected resolution (e.g. 1080p at 60fps, 720p at 120fps). The bitrate can be set to the three levels of “high”, “medium” and “low” relative to the selected resolution and framerate combination.

The LED torch that can be used to illuminate video recordings can be toggled during video recording.

A wireless bluetooth microphone can be used for recording the sound of a video.

== Reception ==
CNET gave the LG V10 a 4 out of 5, praising its incorporation of premium features such as a fingerprint reader and wide-angle front-facing camera options, as well as LG's continued inclusion of a removable battery and expandable storage. It was noted that many of its premium features (such as the dual-front cameras and extra message display) felt more like they were "nice to have" rather than must-have features, concluding that "If the V10's goodies aren't essential for you — meaning you don't need a wider view for your selfies or another screen to access your favorite apps and contacts -- it's best to go with something cheaper." Android Authority concluded that the V10 was a more powerful device than the LG G4 due to its additional features and upgrades, stating that "if the G4 fell short of your expectations and you were looking for more, a lot more is what you are getting with the LG V10."

The V10 was found to be susceptible to hardware failure nearly identical to that of the G4, as both devices suffered from a manufacturing defect that eventually caused instability, and the devices to enter an unrecoverable reboot loop and thus, inoperable. A class-action lawsuit was filed in March 2017, alleging that LG continued to market and distribute phones with the defect even after LG publicized it.

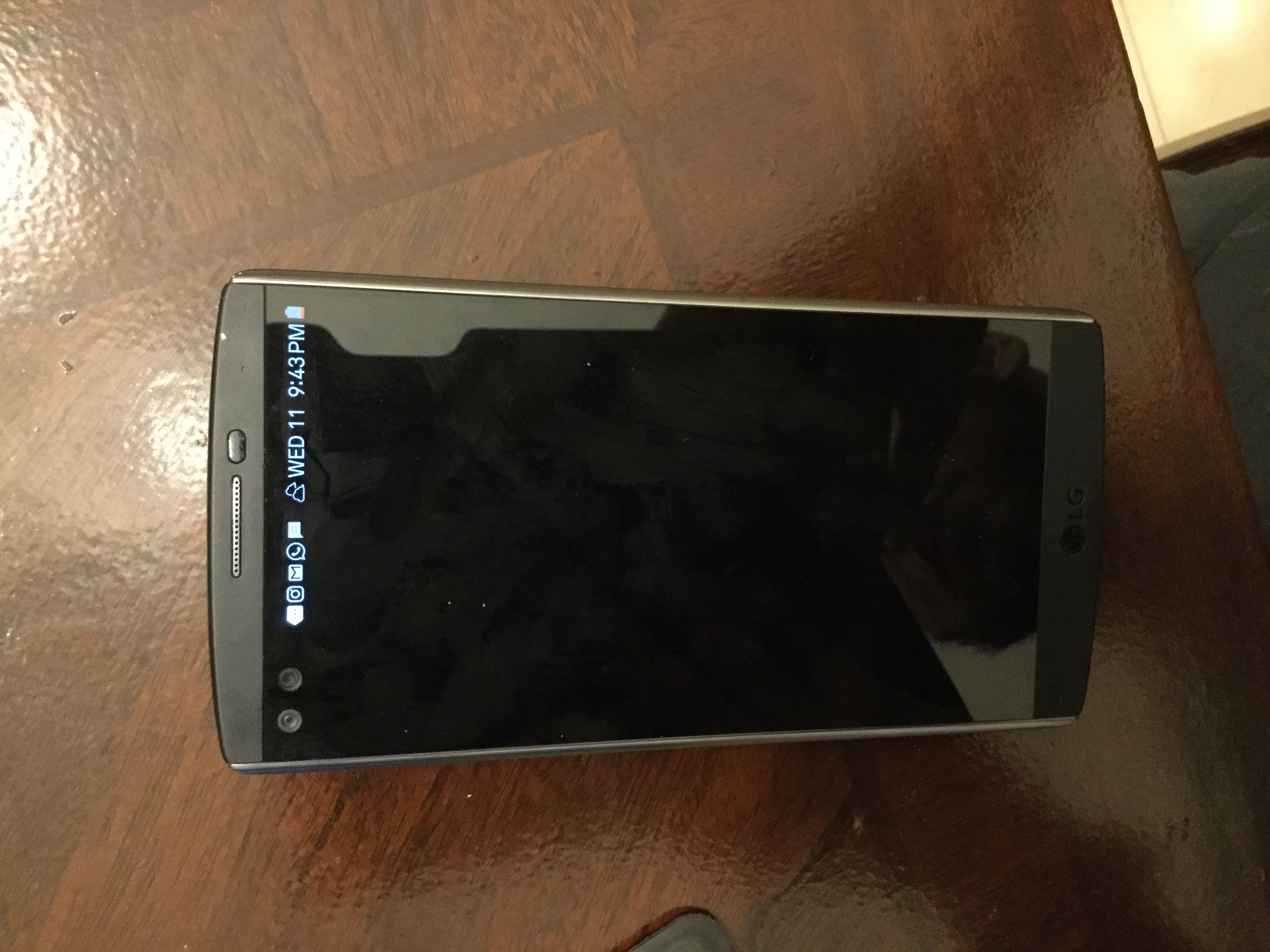
LG V10 Smartphone that was manufactured by LG.
