= LG V40 ThinQ =

Android phone model by LG Electronics

- Brand: LG Electronics
- Manufacturer: LG Electronics
- Type: Phablet
- Series: V series
- First released: October 3, 2018; 7 years ago
- Availability by region: October 18, 2018; 7 years ago (United States)
- Predecessor: LG V35 ThinQ
- Successor: LG V50 ThinQ
- Related: LG G7 ThinQ
- Compatible networks: 2G GSM/GPRS/EDGE – 850, 900, 1800, 1900 MHz; 2G CDMA 1xRTT – 800, 1900 MHz; 3G UMTS/HSDPA/HSUPA/HSPA+ – 850, 900, AWS (1700), 1900, 2000, 2100 MHz; 4G LTE – Bands 1–5, 7–8, 12–14, 17–20, 25–26, 28–30, 38–41, 46–71
- Form factor: Slate
- Operating system: Android 8.1 to Android 10 with LG UX 7.1
- System-on-chip: Qualcomm Snapdragon 845
- GPU: Adreno 630
- Memory: 6 GB RAM
- Storage: 128 GB
- Removable storage: microSDXC, expandable up to 512 GB
- Battery: Non-removable Li-po 3300mAh
- Rear camera: 12 MP, 27mm (standard), f/1.5, 1/2.6", 1.4 μm, 3-axis OIS, dual pixel PDAF 12 MP, 52mm (telephoto), f/2.4, 1.0 μm, 2x optical zoom, OIS, PDAF 16 MP, 16mm (ultrawide), f/1.9, 1/3.1", 1.0 μm, no Auto Focus
- Front camera: 8 MP, 26mm (standard), f/1.9, 1.4 μm 5 MP, 21mm (wide), f/2.2, 1.4 μm
- Display: 6.4 in (163 mm); 3120 × 1440 1440p OLED (19.5:9 aspect ratio) (537 ppi); Dolby Vision; HDR10
- Sound: Single stereo "boombox" speaker 3.5mm headphone jack 32-bit/192kHz audio 24-bit/48kHz audio recording Active noise cancellation with dedicated mic DTS: X Surround Sound, tuned with Meridian Audio
- Connectivity: Wi-Fi 802.11a/b/g/n/ac (2.4 & 5GHz), Bluetooth 5 with aptX, 4G/LTE
- References: https://www.gsmarena.com/lg_v40_thinq-9300.php

The LG V40 ThinQ, commonly referred to as the LG V40, is an Android phablet smartphone manufactured by LG Electronics as part of the LG V series. It was announced on October 3, 2018 and is the successor to the previous devices in the LG V series, namely the LG V30, LG V30S ThinQ, and LG V35 ThinQ. The LG V40 released primarily in the United States on October 18, 2018.

== Features ==
The V40 was LG's first smartphone to feature 5 cameras: 2 on the front and 3 on the back. On the front there are dual cameras, while on the back there is a telephoto lens, a standard lens, and a wide-angle lens. This feature was the marquee feature of the V40. The V40's camera received a score of 97 from DxOMark.

The V40 also featured a 3300 mAh battery, which was standard at the time for the V series (the V30 and its derivatives had also featured a 3300 mAh battery). The phone has built-in Qnovo's intelligent battery management software which aims to extend the lifespan of the battery and provide best battery user experience.
