= LG Electronics =

South Korean multinational electronics company

LG Electronics Inc.
- Logo used since 30 December 2014 (Note: The logo's symbol has been in use since March 1995.)

- LG Twin Tower in Yeouido-dong, Seoul, where LG Electronics is headquartered
- Type: Public
- Traded as: KRX: 066570; LSE: LGLD
- ISIN: US50186Q2021
- Industry: Consumer electronics; Home appliances; HVAC; Automotive electronics; Computer hardware
- Predecessor: GoldStar (1958–2002)
- Founded: October 1958; 68 years ago (as GoldStar); March 1995 (as LG Electronics; re-incorporated in 2002)
- Founder: Koo In-hwoi (The original GoldStar)
- Headquarters: LG Twin Tower 128, Yeouido-dong, Yeongdeungpo District, Seoul, South Korea
- Area served: Worldwide
- Key people: Kwang-Mo Koo (chairman); Lyu Jae-cheol (CEO)
- Products: Televisions & soundbars; Home appliances (refrigerators, washing machines); Air conditioning & heat pumps; Laptops (LG Gram) & monitors; Electric vehicle components & telematics; Digital signage & commercial displays; Audio equipment & projectors
- Services: Smart TV platform licensing (webOS); Streaming media (LG Channels); Smart home platforms (LG ThinQ); Appliance subscription & care services
- Revenue: ▲ ₩89.2 trillion (US$66.55 billion) (2025)
- Operating income: ▼ ₩2.48 trillion (US$1.85 billion) (2025)
- Net income: ▲ ₩1.22 trillion (US$910.56 million) (2025)
- Total assets: ▲ ₩68.62 trillion (US$51.2 billion) (2025)
- Total equity: ▲ ₩28.55 trillion (US$21.3 billion) (2025)
- Owner: LG Corporation (33%)
- Number of employees: 75,000+ (2022)
- Website: lg.com

LG Electronics Inc. (Korean: 엘지 전자; RR: Elji Jeonja) is a South Korean multinational major appliance and consumer electronics corporation headquartered in Yeouido-dong, Seoul, South Korea. LG Electronics is a part of LG Corporation, the fourth largest chaebol in South Korea, and often considered as the pinnacle of LG Corp with the group's chemical and battery division LG Chem. It comprises four business units: Home Appliance Solution (HS), Media Entertainment Solution (MS), Vehicle Solution (VS), and Eco Solution (ES).

LG Electronics' product portfolio includes televisions and audio products, home appliances such as refrigerators, dishwashers, microwaves, washing machines, tumble dryers and air conditioners, as well as commercial and industrial products. The company is associated with technologies such as OLED television displays, the webOS smart TV platform, and the LG ThinQ smart home ecosystem.

LG Electronics acquired Zenith in 1995 and is the largest shareholder of LG Display, the world's largest display company by revenue in 2020. LG Electronics is also the world's second largest television manufacturer behind Samsung Electronics. The company has 128 operations worldwide, employing 83,000 people.

== History ==
=== 1958–1977: Foundation and domestic expansion ===
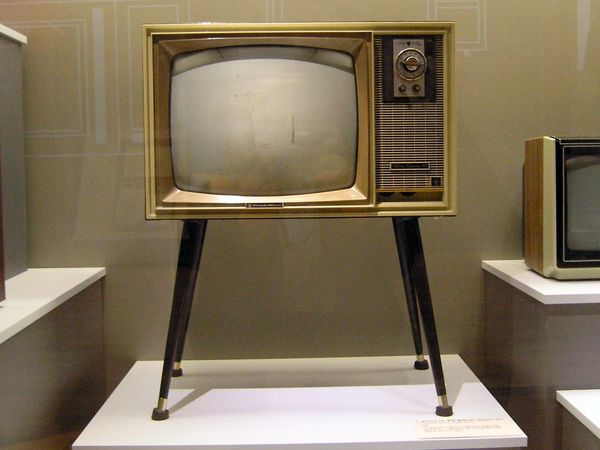
GoldStar television (VD-191), manufactured in 1966

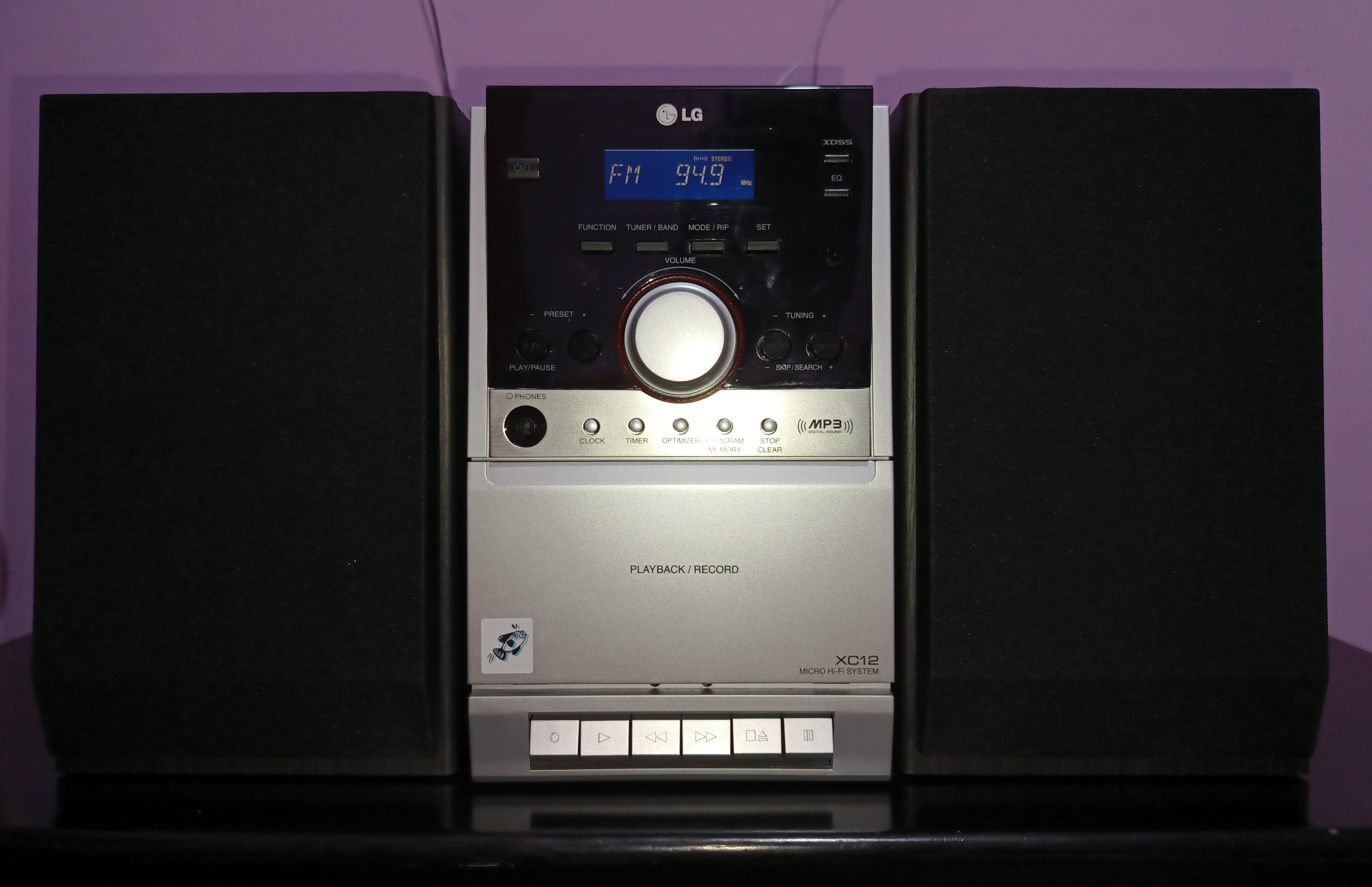
LG Micro Hi-Fi Audio system, c. 2008

In 1958, LG Electronics was founded as GoldStar (Korean: 금성). It was established in the aftermath of the Korean War to provide the rebuilding nation with domestically produced consumer electronics and home appliances. The start of the country's national broadcasting that created a booming electronics market and a close relationship it quickly forged with Hitachi helped GoldStar to produce South Korea's first radios, televisions, refrigerators, washing machines, and air conditioners. GoldStar was the electronics division of Lak-Hui (pronounced "Lucky") Chemical Industrial Corp. which is now LG Chem and LG Household & Health Care. GoldStar merged with Lucky Chemical and GoldStar Cable on 28 February 1995, changing the corporate name to Lucky-Goldstar and then finally to LG Electronics. Goldstar first went public in 1970; by 1976, it was producing one million televisions annually.

=== 1978–1999: Global expansion and brand transformation ===
In 1978, the company also surpassed US$100 million in exports. In 1982, Goldstar opened its first overseas factory, which was based in Huntsville, Alabama. In 1994, GoldStar officially adopted the LG Electronics brand and a new corporate logo. In 1995, LG Electronics acquired the US-based TV manufacturer Zenith and absorbed it four years later. Also in that year, LG Electronics made the world's first CDMA digital mobile handsets and supplied Ameritech and GTE in the US, the LGC-330W digital cellular phone. The company was also awarded UL certification in the US. In 1998, LG developed the world's first 60-inch plasma TV and established a joint venture in 1999 with Philips – LG.Philips LCD – which now goes by the name LG Display. In 1999, LG Semiconductor merged with Hynix.

=== 2000–2010: Digital electronics and display ===
LG Electronics had operated LGE.com in 2000. In order to create a holding company, the former LG Electronics was split off in 2002, with the "new" LG Electronics being spun off and the "old" LG Electronics changing its name to LG EI. It was then merged with and into LG CI in 2003 (the legal successor of the former LG Chem), so the company that started as GoldStar does not exist.

In 2004, LG.Philips LCD completed an initial public offering and was listed on the New York Stock Exchange and the Korea Exchange; it was later renamed LG Display. By 2005, LG was a Top 100 global brand and recorded a brand growth of 14% in 2006. In 2006, LG developed its first Multi V variable refrigerant flow (VRF) system. As of 2009, its display manufacturing affiliate, LG Display, was the world's largest LCD panel manufacturer. LG Electronics has since continued to develop various electronic products, such as releasing the world's first 84-inch ultra-HD TV for retail sale.

=== 2010–2019: Smart devices and premium technology ===
In 2010 Ericsson acquired Nortel's controlling stake in LG-Nortel, a joint venture with LG Electronics, and the company was later renamed LG-Ericsson. In 2011, LG released the LG Optimus 2X, which Guinness World Records recognized as the first mobile phone to use a dual-core processor.

On 5 December 2012, the antitrust regulators of the European Union fined LG Electronics and five other major companies (Samsung, Thomson since 2022 known as Vantiva, Matsushita which today is Panasonic Corp, Philips and Toshiba) for fixing prices of TV cathode-ray tubes in two cartels lasting nearly a decade.

LG Electronics plays a large role in the global consumer electronics industry; it was the second-largest LCD TV manufacturer worldwide as of 2013. In 2013, LG established its Vehicle component business, marking a formal expansion into automotive electronics.

On 11 June 2015, LG Electronics found itself in the midst of a human rights controversy when The Guardian published an article by Rosa Moreno, a former employee of an LG television assembly factory. Moreno was offered $3800 in compensation after losing both hands in an industrial accident while working for a subcontrator making parts for LG-branded flatscreen televisions.

At the end of 2016, LG Electronics merged its German branch (situated in Ratingen) and European headquarter (situated in London) together in Eschborn, a suburb of Frankfurt am Main. In March 2017, LG Electronics was sued for its handling of hardware failures with recent smartphones such as the LG G4.

Koo Bon-joon, who was the CEO and the current vice chairman of LG Electronics, was replaced by his nephew Koo Kwang-mo in July 2018 as CEO and vice chairman. The move came after the succession of Koo Kwang-mo as the chairman of the parent company LG Corporation who succeeded his adoptive father and uncle Koo Bon-moo after Bon-moo died of a brain tumor on 20 May 2018.

LG announced in November 2018 that Hwang Jeong-hwan, who took the job as president of LG Mobile Communications in October 2017, will be replaced by Brian Kwon, who is head of LG's hugely profitable home entertainment business, from the 1st of December 2018. In 2018, LG Electronics acquired a 70 percent stake in Austrian automotive lighting company ZKW Group, while LG Corp. acquired the remaining 30 percent. Also in 2018, LG decided to stop smartphone production in South Korea to move production to Vietnam, in order to stay competitive. LG said Vietnam provides an "abundant labor force" and that 750 workers at its South Korean handset factory would be relocated to its home appliance plant.

=== 2020–present: Business restructuring and expansion ===
In 2020, LG Electronics ranked fourth among global applicants under the Patent Cooperation Treaty system, according to the World Intellectual Property Organization. In the same year, LG began selling its rollable OLED television in South Korea.

On 5 April 2021, LG announced its withdrawal from the phone manufacturing industry after continuous loss in the market. In 2020, LG faced a loss of 5 trillion won (US$4.4 billion). In July 2021, LG Electronics formed LG Magna e-Powertrain, a joint venture with Magna International focused on electric vehicle powertrain components, including motors, inverters and onboard chargers.

In June 2021, the YouTube channel Hardware Unboxed published a video alleging an attempt by a representative of LG to manipulate the review of one of LG's gaming monitors. The representative, in an email shown in the video, attempts to influence the editorial outcome of the review by indicating testing methods and aspects of the display to be followed by the channel. This came a few months after a similar incident between the creators and Nvidia in which Nvidia warned them that if they continue emphasizing on rasterization rather than ray tracing in Nvidia's graphics cards, they would no longer receive review samples. Hardware Unboxed later stated that LG Electronics had contacted the channel and would change how it handled monitor reviews.

As of 1 December 2021, the Chief Strategy Officer William Cho will take over for Bong-seok Kwon as the CEO of LG Electronics. In June 2022, LG acquired AppleMango, a South Korean EV charger manufacturer with a 60% purchase of the company's stocks The acquisition marked LG's entry into the electric vehicle charging business. In that same month, the American publication Consumer Reports rated LG home appliances as the most reliable in the U.S. consumer market. In 2022 and 2023, two LG Electronics home appliance manufacturing facilities, LG Smart Park in Changwon, South Korea, and its plant in Tennessee, United States, were selected by the World Economic Forum as Lighthouse Factories. In April 2024, a security firm discovered security bugs in tens of thousands of LG smart TV models that could "let hackers hijack them". The vulnerability particularly affects smart TVs running LG's WebOS operating system from version 4 to version 7. The vulnerabilities had been reported to LG in November 2023, and LG released patches for the affected models on 22 March 2024, before the research was publicly disclosed.

In December 2025, Texas Attorney General Ken Paxton filed a lawsuit against LG and four other smart TV manufacturers, alleging that the companies were illegally "spying on Texans by secretly recording what consumers watch in their own homes" using automated content recognition (ACR) technology.

In January 2026, LG Electronics announced it would unveil an AI-powered home robot called LG CLOiD at CES 2026. The robot supports LG's "Zero Labor Home" vision and is designed to autonomously perform household tasks, coordinate connected appliances and interact naturally with residents.

== Corporate governance ==
Shareholder	Stake (%)	Flag
LG	33.67%	South Korea
National Pension Service	8.47%	South Korea
Treasury Stock	0.47%	South Korea

=== Logo evolution ===
1958-1961

1961-1962

1962-1963

1963-1964

1964-1965

1965

1965-1975

1995-2014

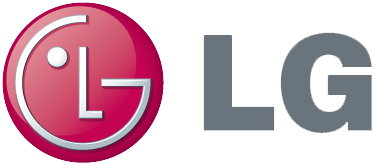
2008-2014

2014–present

2014–present (3D)

=== COVID-19 response ===
On 25 December 2021, LG Electronics launched a video campaign showing some of the initiatives the company has taken in India during the COVID-19 pandemic. The video shows how the company has handled the pandemic from the beginning by encouraging good hygiene practices to include social distancing, hand-washing, mask wearing, and using hand sanitizers.

In a strategy to cope with demand for contactless shopping during the COVID-19 pandemic, LG Electronics opened a number of unmanned stores that allowed for customers to authenticate themselves at the main entrance, check product information, and purchase products using a mobile phone or QR code. The company operates nine unmanned stores and this will increase to 30 by the end of June 2022. These locations are only available in South Korea.

=== United States headquarters ===
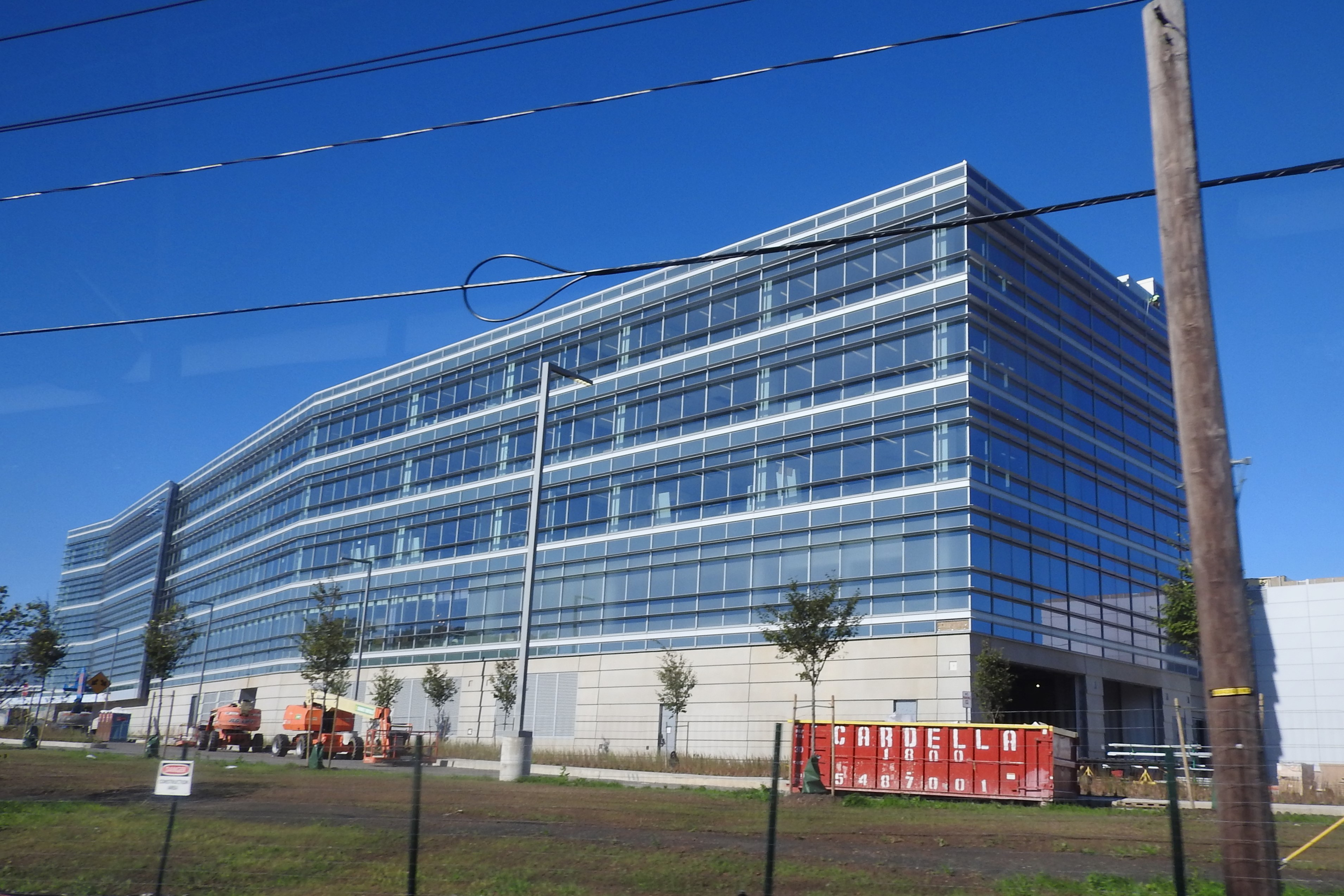
October 2019 in Englewood Cliffs

In 2013, LG Electronics USA proposed building a new headquarters in the borough of Englewood Cliffs in Bergen County, New Jersey, including a 143 ft (44 m) tall building that would stand taller than the tree line of the Hudson Palisades, a US National Natural Landmark. The company proposed to build an environmentally friendly facility in Englewood Cliffs, incidental to Bergen County's per-capita leading Korean American population, having received an initially favorable legal decision concerning building height issues. The plan, while approved by the local government, met with resistance from the segments of the general public as well as government officials in New Jersey and adjacent New York. The initial court decision upholding the local government approval was overturned by a New Jersey appellate court in 2015 and LG subsequently submitted a revised, scaled-down, 64-foot building for approval by the borough of Englewood Cliffs in 2016. LG broke ground on the new US$300 million Englewood Cliffs headquarters on 7 February 2017, opened in late 2019.

== Products ==
LG Electronics products include televisions including hospitality televisions for hotels and commercial industrials, home theater systems, home audio, portable audio and headphones, refrigerators, washing machines, computer monitors, wearable devices, vehicle components including IVI, EV components, and lighting systems, air conditioning and HVAC products, smart appliances and formerly smartphones and solar panels.

=== Home appliances ===
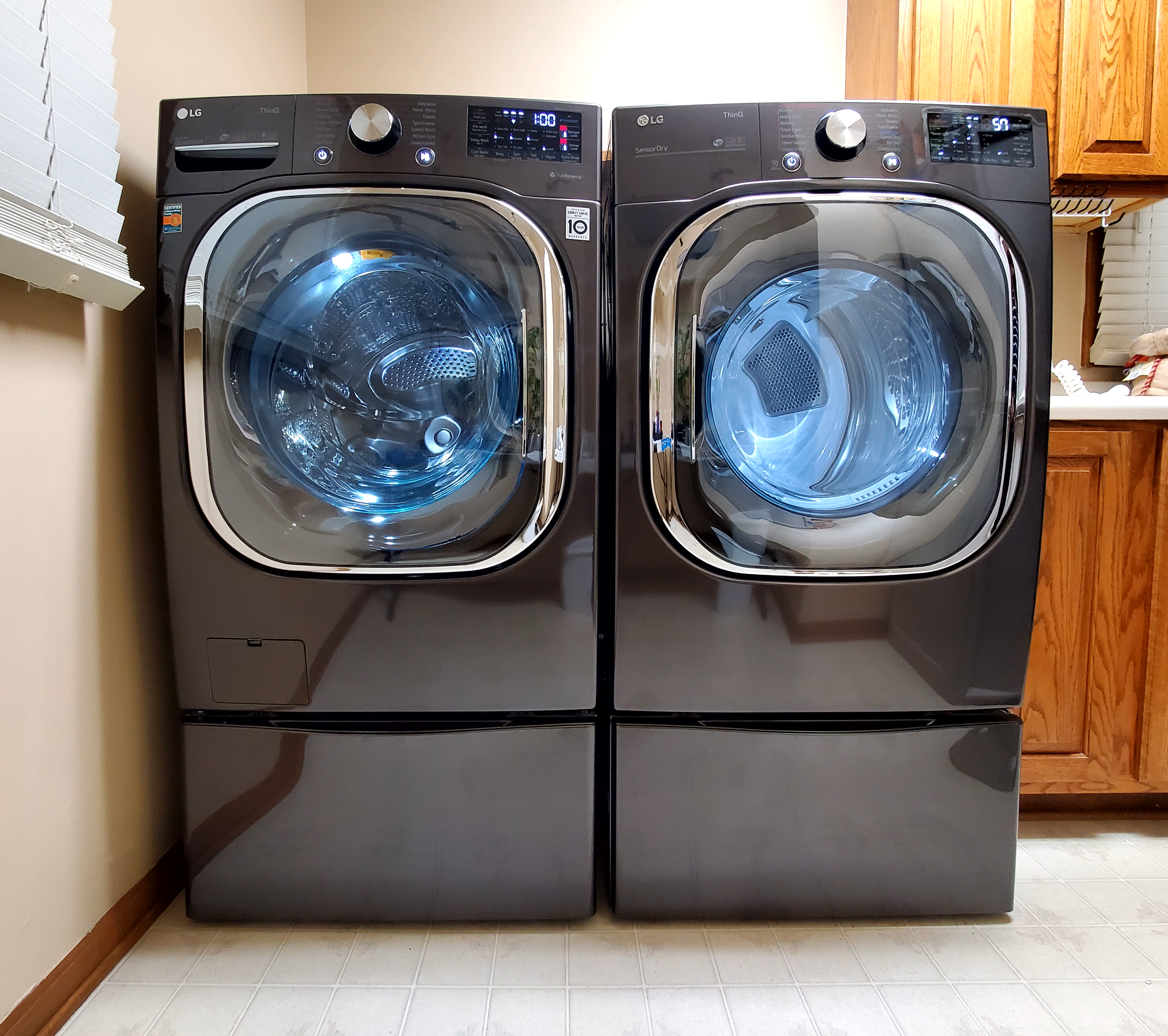
LG washer and dryer on pedestals

LG manufactures home appliances including refrigerators, Dishwasher, Water purifier, washing machines, tumble dryers, garment steamers, vacuum cleaners, air conditioners and microwave ovens. In June 2014, LG Electronics announced the launch of its smart appliances with HomeChat messaging service in South Korea. HomeChat employs LINE, the mobile messenger app from Korean company 'Naver', to let homeowners communicate, control, monitor and share content with LG's smart appliances. Users can send simple messages, such as "start washing cycle," in order to control their washing machines.

In December 2021, LG Electronics announced they were testing an ecologically friendly washing machine that uses liquid carbon dioxide as a cleaner. The company will be conducting a two-year test prove the safety with a goal of having commercial CO_{2} washers in shopping mall laundries. This new process creates no wastewater and will exhaust gas.

==== Washing machines ====
GoldStar, the predecessor of LG Electronics, produced the WP-181 washing machine in 1969, which South Korea's Cultural Heritage Administration lists as the first washing machine made in Korea.

In 1998, LG introduced its inverter direct drive motor for washing machines, a design in which the motor is connected directly to the washing tub rather than using a belt or pulley. This made them the first company to successfully mass-market the technology globally in front-loading machines.

In 2015, LG introduced the TWINWash system, the world's first washing system combining a drum washer with a secondary mini washer.

In 2017, LG announced plans to build a washing machine factory in Clarksville, Tennessee, described by the Tennessee Department of Economic and Community Development as LG's first washing machine manufacturing operation in the United States. The plant opened in 2019 and produced its one millionth washing machine in 2020. In 2023, the Clarksville facility was selected by the World Economic Forum as a Lighthouse Factory.

The WashTower, a vertically stacked washer–dryer introduced in 2020, and the WashCombo, a single-drum washer–dryer introduced in 2024, were each the first of their kind in the South Korean market.

==== Clothes dryers ====
LG entered the clothes dryer market in South Korea in 1984 through its predecessor GoldStar. Early models primarily used heater-based drying systems that remove moisture from clothing through heated air circulation.

In September 2016, LG introduced the world's first clothes dryer with a dual-hinge door capable of opening both horizontally and vertically.

LG ranked highest in customer satisfaction among clothes dryers, leading in performance, styling, and value in the J.D. Power 2025 U.S. Home Appliance Satisfaction Study.

LG Styler at IFA 2015

==== Clothes steamer ====
In 2011, LG Electronics introduced a clothing care appliance line known as the LG Styler, described as the world's first garment care appliance for home use. The Styler uses steam to refresh clothing without conventional washing or dry cleaning.

Unlike handheld garment steamers, which apply steam directly to individual items, the Styler is a cabinet-type appliance that simultaneously treats multiple garments through steam, vibration, and drying within an enclosed unit.

==== Vacuum cleaner ====
LG Electronics' vacuum cleaner business began in 1976, when its predecessor GoldStar introduced corded canister vacuum cleaners to the South Korean market.

In 2003, LG introduced the RoboKing, described as Korea's first robotic vacuum cleaner. LG later expanded its cordless vacuum cleaner lineup through its CordZero series.

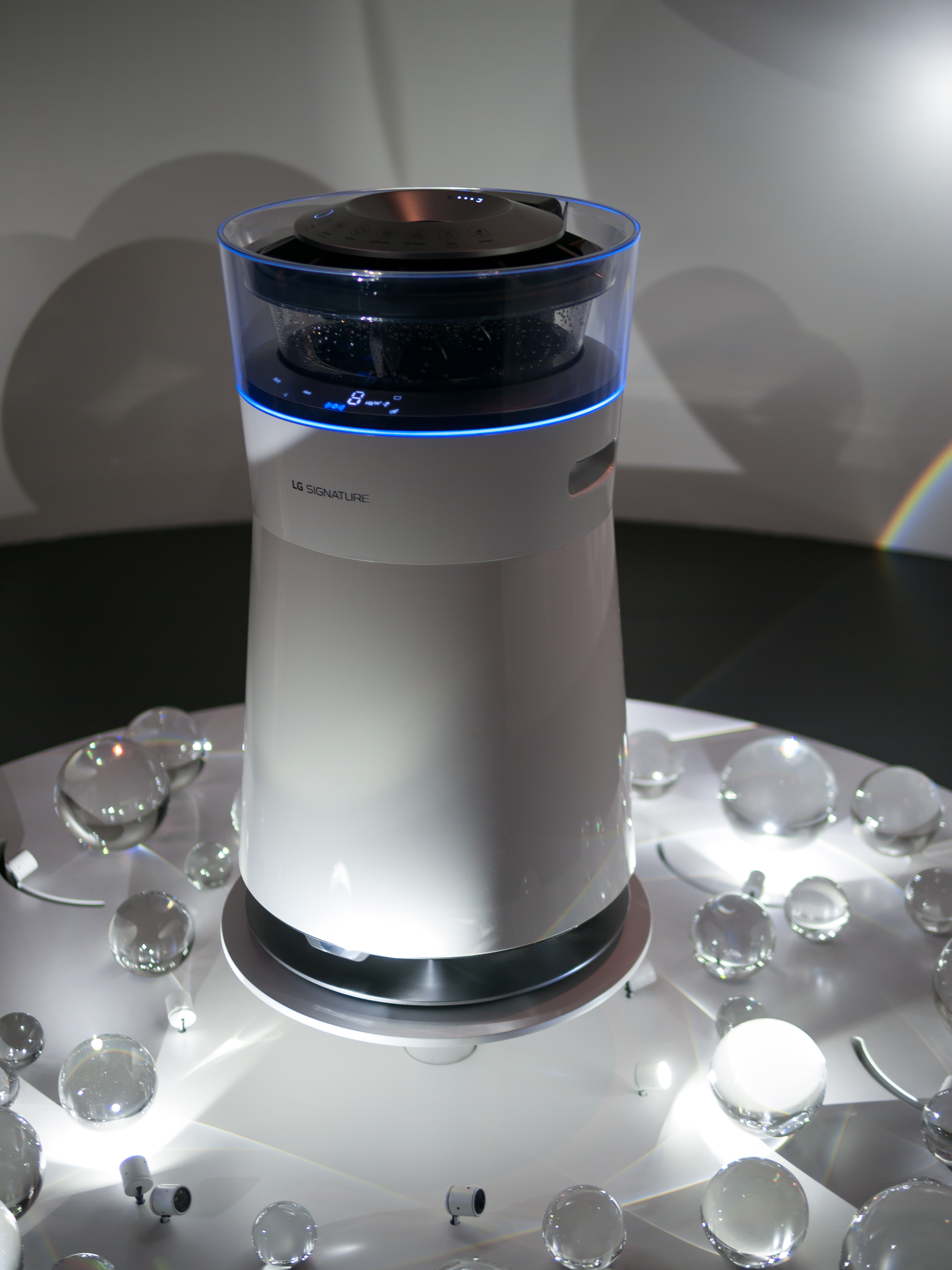
LG Signature LSA 50 A air purifier

==== Water purifier ====
LG Electronics entered the home water purifier market in 2009. The company developed water purifiers using technologies derived from its home appliance business, including cooling, hygiene and inverter-based systems. In 2016, the company introduced a water purifier equipped with an inverter compressor, the first such model in South Korea. Following this, the company launched its direct-flow water purifier lineup under the PuriCare brand. In July 2017, LG reported that sales of the PuriCare Slim water purifier had exceeded 100,000 units over the previous three months, equivalent to one unit sold every 80 seconds. In 2021, the company introduced a model capable of sterilizing internal water pathways using high-temperature water, described as the first of its kind in South Korea.

==== Refrigerator ====
GoldStar, the predecessor of LG Electronics, produced South Korea's first domestic refrigerator in 1965. In June 2000, LG introduced the Internet Digital DIOS, the first internet-connected refrigerator, incorporating a TFT-LCD screen, LAN connectivity, and food management features.

In 2001, LG introduced the world's first refrigerator to incorporate a linear compressor motor, a design in which the piston moves in a straight line rather than through a rotary mechanism.

In 2007, LG sold 1 million of its Inverter Linear Compressor-equipped refrigerators and increased that number to 5 million in 2011 and reached the 10 million milestone in 2014.

LG ranked highest in customer satisfaction among French Door Refrigerators and Side-by-Side Refrigerators, leading across metrics including durability, features, and value in the J.D. Power 2025 U.S. Home Appliance Satisfaction Study.

==== Cooking ====
GoldStar, the predecessor of LG Electronics, began manufacturing microwave ovens in the United States at its Huntsville, Alabama plant in 1983 LG ranked highest in customer satisfaction among ranges in the J.D. Power 2025 U.S. Home Appliance Satisfaction Study.

==== Dishwasher ====
LG introduced its first dishwasher using an Inverter Direct Drive motor in North America in 2006 LG dishwashers are designed for automated cleaning of tableware and cookware and are typically sold as built-in kitchen appliances In 2022, LG introduced QuadWash Pro along with Dynamic Heat Dry technology, designed to improve drying performance through increased airflow and optimized heat circulation within the dishwasher tub. In 2023 several LG dishwasher models received the ENERGY STAR Most Efficient designation for meeting high energy- and water-efficiency standards.

==== SKS ====
In 2016, LG launched SKS (formerly Signature Kitchen Suite) as its luxury built-in appliance line, focused on the high-premium product tier. It launched first in the US at the 2016 Kitchen & Bath Industry Show (KBIS) show. In early 2019, LG opened an appliance showroom intended for architects, designers and consumers, called the "Experience & Design Center," in Napa, California. In February 2025, LG formally abbreviated the brand name from "Signature Kitchen Suite" to "SKS," at KBIS in Las Vegas. LG also debuted new branding and products at the same show, including a "hidden" induction cooktop.

SKS's portfolio includes professional ranges, rangetops, wall ovens, combination steam and convection ovens, column, French-door and under-counter refrigerators and dishwashers. At KBIS 2018, SKS debuted pro ranges with a built-in sous vide module, which was an industry first, and then added the sous video module to more ranges in 2019 and 2020.

=== Televisions ===
LG has been a television manufacturer since the early development of South Korea's consumer electronics industry. Under its former brand GoldStar, the company produced South Korea's first domestically manufactured black-and-white television in 1966. The company later expanded into color television, large-screen displays, and digital broadcasting technologies.

In 2004, LG introduced a 55-inch Full HD LCD television, which at the time was among the largest television displays available. In the same year, the company also unveiled a 71-inch Full HD plasma display television. LG Electronics introduced its first Internet TV in 2007, originally branded as "Net Cast Entertainment Access" devices. The LG SL9000 was one of several new Borderless HDTV's advertised for release at IFA Berlin in 2009. They later renamed the 2011 Internet televisions to "LG Smart TV" when more interactive television features were added, that enable the audience to receive information from the Internet while watching conventional TV programming along with the world's first 84-inch Ultra HD TV

In November 2013, a blogger discovered that some of LG's smart TVs silently collect filenames from attached USB storage devices and program viewing data, and transmit the information to LG's servers and LG-affiliated servers. Shortly after this blog entry went live, LG disabled playback on its site of the video, explaining how its viewer analytics work, and closed the Brightcove account the video was hosted on.

In 2016, exclusively to India, Indian arm of South Korea's LG Electronics Inc started selling a TV that would repel mosquitoes. It uses ultrasonic waves that are silent to humans but cause mosquitoes to fly away. It was released on 16 June 2016. The technology was also used in air conditioners and washing machines. The TV is aimed for lower-income consumers living in conditions that would make them susceptible to mosquitoes.

In 2018, it was reported that LG was planning to sell big-screen televisions that could be rolled up and retract automatically with the push of a button come 2019.

==== OLED ====
LG Electronics launched the world's first 55-inch OLED TV in 2013 and 65-inch and 77-inch sizes in 2014. With these launches, LG became the first company to mass-produce large sized OLED TV panels. In August 2018 at IFA in Berlin, LG exhibited the first 8K OLED television. In October 2020, LG launched the first rollable OLED television available for commercial purchase.

At CES 2026, LG announced its 2026 OLED range, featuring a picture technology called "Hyper Radiant Color". In independent testing, the flagship G6 measured 3,004 nits of peak HDR brightness, compared with 2,268 nits for the preceding G5. Its anti-reflection screen was certified by Intertek as "Reflection Free Premium", with reflectance below 0.5 per cent. A reviewer found that the screen reduced reflections while preserving OLED black levels, but observed a green tint affecting skin tones on the G6 and B6E. In June 2026, LG Display said that its large-sized OLED panels were the first to receive Intertek's "Perfect Color/Brightness Accuracy up to 500 lux" certification. The test maintains a constant average picture level, meaning that its results are not directly comparable with conventional peak-brightness measurements.

The range also included the OLED evo W6, which revived the flush-mount "Wallpaper" design that LG introduced in 2017 and discontinued in 2020. Available in 77- and 83-inch sizes, the W6 has a nine-millimeter-class body and uses a separate Zero Connect box to transmit 4K video and audio wirelessly to the panel. LG markets the W6 as the world's first certified 4K 165 Hz "True Wireless" television. In 2023, the company had described the 97-inch M3 as the world's first wireless OLED television, with wireless video and audio transmission at up to 4K 120 Hz. The term "wireless" refers to the audiovisual connection between the Zero Connect box and the screen: the W6 display still requires a power cable, while a reviewer noted that both the M3 screen and its Zero Connect box require mains power.

==== Micro RGB ====
Micro RGB (marketed as Micro RGB evo) is a line of LCD televisions produced by LG Electronics. LG introduced the line at the Consumer Electronics Show in January 2026. Intertek certified the LG Micro RGB evo as achieving "Triple 100 Percent Color Coverage", and TÜV Rheinland certified the line under its "High Purity RGB Spectrum Display" programme.

==== QNED ====
QNED is a line of LCD televisions produced by LG Electronics. LG announced its first QNED Mini LED LCD televisions in December 2020, ahead of their official presentation at CES 2021. The line combines LG's NanoCell technology and Mini LED backlighting. It was the first LG television line enhanced color tech with Nanocell filtering, which is used to reduce dull or impure colours. The QNED line sits below LG's OLED television range and above its standard NanoCell models.

==== NANO 4K UHD ====
Nano 4K UHD, marketed under the NanoCell name since its introduction at IFA 2017, is a line of LCD televisions produced by LG Electronics.

The line uses a layer of one-nanometer particles within the LCD panel to absorb light wavelengths that fall between the red and green colour filters; conventional colour filter arrays allow these wavelengths to pass through, causing colour bleed between adjacent subpixels. The AU Review described the result as "more accurate colour, specifically through narrowing red and green wavelengths for more purity," along with wider viewing angles than standard LCD panels.

In 2020, LG's 8K NanoCell models were among the first LCD televisions to qualify for the Consumer Technology Association's 8K Ultra HD logo, which requires a minimum contrast modulation (CM) value of 50 percent; independent testing by Intertek recorded the NanoCell 8K's CM value at approximately 90 percent, well above the threshold.

LG positions the Nano 4K UHD line as the entry-level tier of its television range, below its QNED and OLED lines.

==== webOS ====
As of 2014, LG is using webOS with a ribbon interface with some of its smart TVs. LG reported that in the first eight months after release, it had sold over 5 million webOS TVs.

LG manufactures remote control models that use Hillcrest Labs' Freespace technology to allow users to change channels using gestures and Dragon NaturallySpeaking technology for voice recognition.

In late 2023, LG committed to providing major webOS upgrades for televisions sold from 2024 onward, along with selected 2022 and 2023 models. The initiative was subsequently introduced as the webOS Re:New program, under which eligible televisions receive up to four major version upgrades over five years.

webOS 26, LG's television software for 2026, adds Voice ID for loading individual user profiles and AI Concierge for providing context-aware suggestions based on viewing activity. Google Gemini and Microsoft Copilot support voice-based questions and related-content searches, with some AI search capabilities requiring a subscription. The platform also supports Home Hub, Matter, Apple AirPlay and Google Cast, as well as a generative AI image feature on supported models. LG applies a security system it markets as LG Shield, which uses encryption to protect user data and personalized services.

Gallery+, introduced in August 2025, allows compatible televisions to display artwork and other images when not in use, and was compared with art-display services offered by Samsung and other manufacturers. At launch, LG said the service offered more than 4,000 selected images, with a free light version available in more than 150 countries and a subscription version available in 23 countries. Users could also generate images through Google Gemini. By May 2026, LG stated that the collection had expanded to more than 5,000 artworks.

=== Audio ===
Since December 2017, LG has co-developed its soundbars with British high-end audio manufacturer Meridian Audio, whose digital signal processing technologies are integrated into the company's premium models. In 2025, LG Electronics and musician will.i.am produced the xboom line of portable Bluetooth speakers and wireless earbuds.

At CES 2026, LG Electronics introduced LG Sound Suite, a Wi-Fi-based modular home audio system. Unveiled through a joint announcement by Dolby Laboratories and LG Electronics, it is documented as the world's first soundbar-based audio system to feature Dolby Atmos FlexConnect, a technology that detects the positions of compatible wireless speakers to optimize audio for asymmetric room layouts. Designed as a highly scalable and modular ecosystem, it offers more than 50 customizable hardware configurations, allowing users to expand their setup by integrating various wireless speakers and subwoofers according to their preferences. The system's flagship H7 soundbar supports LG's Sound Follow feature, which utilizes ultra-wideband (UWB) positioning to dynamically adjust the sound based on the location of the listener.

=== Computing ===
==== Monitors ====
In 2016, the company introduced the UltraFine 5K display with Thunderbolt 3, which it described as the world's first 5K display with Thunderbolt 3. In 2019, LG announced what it described as the world's first one-millisecond IPS gaming monitor under its UltraGear brand. At CES 2025, LG announced the UltraGear GX9 series, including what it described as the world's first 5K2K bendable gaming monitor; This series won three CES 2025 awards. In 2022, LG monitor models have also received design recognition. Red Dot has listed awards for products including the DualUp Monitor Ergo.

LG released the UltraFine evo 6K, a 32-inch monitor with a 6,144 × 3,456 IPS Black panel at 224 pixels per inch. It was described as the first 6K monitor to launch with Thunderbolt 5, which carries video, data and up to 96 W of power over a single cable.

Ahead of CES 2026, LG introduced UltraGear evo, a premium line within its existing UltraGear gaming monitor sub-brand. The 39-inch GX9 (39GX950B) uses a curved 5,120 × 2,160 OLED panel and was described by LG as the first 39-inch 5K2K OLED gaming monitor. The 27-inch GM9 (27GM950B) pairs a 5,120 × 2,880 panel with a 2,304-zone backlight that LG markets as Hyper Mini LED. It is rated at 1,250 nits of peak brightness and certified to VESA DisplayHDR 1000.

==== Laptops ====
LG Electronics produces the LG gram, a line of laptop computers first released in South Korea in 2014 and expanded to international markets in 2015. The line focuses on minimizing weight, with some configurations weighing as little as 980 grams. It has expanded to include standard clamshell, convertible 2-in-1, and ultraslim configurations. In 2019, the gram line received three Guinness World Records for the lightest laptop in its screen-size category.

Beginning with its 2026 lineup, LG introduced Aerominum, an aluminium-magnesium alloy developed by the company, which LG said reduced weight while improving structural strength and scratch resistance.

=== Heating and cooling ===
LG Electronics has developed heating and cooling systems since the late 20th century. Its portfolio includes air conditioners, heat pumps, chillers, and building energy management systems for residential, commercial, and industrial applications.

==== Air conditioners ====
LG's air conditioning business dates to 1968, when its predecessor GoldStar introduced the GA-111, described as the first domestically produced air conditioner in South Korea.

In 1979, LG introduced the GA-100SP, described as South Korea's first wall-mounted air conditioner.

==== Heat pumps ====
LG produces air-to-water heat pump systems for residential applications under the Therma V name. The company also produces heat pump chillers for commercial applications. The company entered the commercial chiller market in 2011 through the acquisition of a chiller business from LS Mtron, a South Korean industrial manufacturer. In June 2025, LG agreed to acquire OSO, a Norway-based water heating manufacturer founded in 1932, with production facilities in Norway and Sweden.

==== HVAC systems ====
Multi V outdoor units

LG produces variable refrigerant flow (VRF) systems for commercial buildings under the Multi V brand name, first introduced in 2006. The fourth-generation Multi V IV was introduced in 2013. The fifth-generation Multi V 5 followed in 2017. In 2023, LG announced the Multi V i, a VRF system featuring artificial intelligence that adjusts heating and cooling output based on the number of people in a room, humidity, and indoor and outdoor temperatures. The company also produces large-scale chillers for commercial and industrial buildings, entering the chiller market in 2011 through the acquisition of a chiller business from LS Mtron, a South Korean industrial manufacturer. In 2017, LG began mass production of large-scale chillers using oil-free magnetic bearing compressor technology. In 2023, LG Electronics had received the Air-Conditioning, Heating and Refrigeration Institute (AHRI) Performance Award for the sixth consecutive year, across multiple product categories including VRF systems and chillers. By late 2024, LG ranked fifth in the global large-scale chiller market. In December 2024, LG partnered with South Korea's Ministry of Trade, Industry and Energy to expand exports of its chiller systems for data centers.

=== Mobility ===
The company launched a vehicle component division in 2013 and expanded it to cover in-vehicle infotainment (IVI) technologies, including audio, video and navigation, displays, telematics, and Advanced Driver Assistance Systems (ADAS) vision systems, as well as EV powertrain solutions.

LG expanded its mobility component business in the 2010s through electric vehicle and lighting-related projects. In 2015, LG developed in-vehicle experience solutions for General Motors’ Chevrolet Bolt EV, investing more than $250 million in an engineering and manufacturing facility in Incheon for the project. In 2018, LG acquired ZKW Group, an Austrian automotive lighting company, for about $1.3 billion. ZKW's customers include European automakers such as Volkswagen, Audi, BMW, Porsche and Mercedes-Benz.

The company later expanded into electric vehicle powertrain components. In July 2021, LG and Canadian automotive supplier Magna International established LG Magna e-Powertrain, a joint venture manufacturing e-drive systems including e-motors, inverters, onboard chargers, and integrated power generation modules. Magna held a 49 percent stake in the venture, valued at approximately USD 1 billion, with LG retaining the remaining 51 percent. That same year, LG acquired Cybellum to enhance its cybersecurity capabilities in response to rapid electrification trends in the automotive market.

In 2021, LG developed an Android Automotive-based in-vehicle infotainment system with Renault, which debuted in the Renault Mégane E-Tech Electric. In 2023, Hyundai Motor Group and LG announced—as part of their software-defined vehicle (SDV) solutions— the integration of LG’s webOS for Automotive Content Platform (ACP) in Genesis vehicles.

Additionally, LG manufactures advanced mobility solutions for numerous global automakers, including Volkswagen, Renault, Jaguar, Land Rover, General Motors, Toyota, and Hyundai. The company also produces teardrop trailers and supplies displays for various other vehicle manufacturers.

==== Head Unit ====
In-Vehicle Infotainment (IVI) systems are a core component of the digital cockpit, delivering integrated driving information and entertainment features to both drivers and passengers. LG Electronics has described the automobile as a "Living Space on Wheels" and develops IVI systems based on its experience in customer experience (CX) technologies.

==== Automotive Display ====
To address the 'Screenification' trend where vehicles evolve into living spaces powered by diverse new form-factors with display technologies, LG Electronics and Mercedes-Benz have developed OLED-based IVI system for the Mercedes-Benz EQS, featuring a curved panoramic display that spans the entire dashboard.

==== Telematics ====
Telematics, a portmanteau of telecommunications and informatics, refers to systems that connect vehicles to external networks to enable a wide array of services. LG Electronics leads the global market in this sector with world-class technology. LG firmly secures the top spot in the global Telematics Control Unit (TCU) market, with market research firm Strategy Analytics estimating its 2024 market share at 24.4%.

==== ADAS Vision System ====
Advanced Driver Assistance Systems (ADAS)—often called the 'eyes of the autonomous vehicle'—utilize cameras and sensors to perceive surroundings, detect hazards, and assist driver safety. In 2021, LG Electronics supplied the Mercedes-Benz C-Class with comprehensive ADAS camera solutions, including external front-facing cameras and in-cabin sensing technologies.

==== Software ====
As the automotive industry shifts from hardware-centric designs to Software-Defined Vehicles (SDVs), LG Electronics has launched 'LG αWare,' its integrated software solution brand, positioning itself as a core player in the SDV era.

=== Mobile devices ===
In April 2021, LG officially confirmed that it will shut down its mobile division. Earlier, there had been rumours that LG considered selling its mobile division with Vingroup and Volkswagen named as potential buyers.

Other than mobile phones, LG Electronics have also made tablet computers like the LG G series complementing the mobile phones. LG also makes laptop computers in the LG Gram line, and previously under the Xnote line (see List of LG laptops).

==== Mobile phones ====
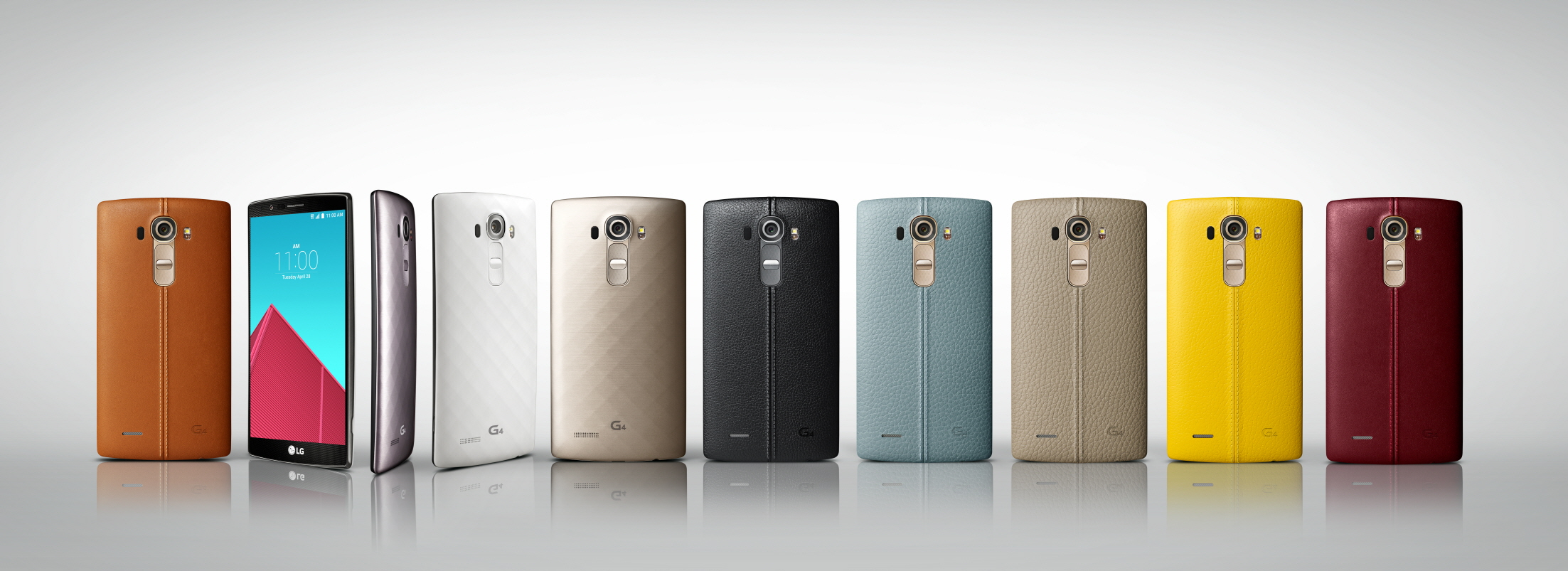
LG G4 range

LG Electronics used to manufacture mobile phones from 1995 to 2021, selling to the domestic market only (as Cyon) until 2000 where it was in the shadow of Samsung Anycall. LG released its first GSM network phones during 2001 although had also marketed CDMA phones before then in the U.S. LG made its breakthrough during the mid and late 2000s: it launched its highly popular LG Chocolate in worldwide in 2006 which popularised touch-sensitivity. The following year it released the world's first capacitive touchscreen phone LG Prada, and Shine, cementing its focus on design: its phones during this era have led to LG being called alongside Apple as one of the pioneers of the rise of touchscreens. By 2008 LG had entered the top 3 worldwide leaders in mobile phones.

There was further success with the Cookie which helped to bring touchscreens to the budget market, and with the Lollipop flip phone that became very popular in South Korea. However the company had trouble with competing in smartphones. In 2010, LG released the Optimus smartphone, which would span into a series. The following year saw the release of the LG Optimus 3D, the world's first mobile phone with glasses-free 3D display, and LG Optimus 2X, the first with a dual-core processor. In 2012 LG worked with Google to build the Nexus 4 smartphone.

Other than the G3, LG officially unveiled the curved smartphone, LG G Flex, on 27 October 2013. At Consumer Electronics Show in January 2014, LG announced a US release for the G2 across several major carriers. In 2015, LG released LG G4 globally in late May through early June. On 7 September 2016, LG unveiled the V20, and the V30 was announced on 31 August 2017. LG G6 was officially announced during MWC 2017 on 26 February 2017. The G7 ThinQ model was announced at a 2 May 2018 media briefing. In 2020, the LG Wing was introduced with two displays and a swivel design.

In April 2021, after months of speculation, LG confirmed that the smartphone division will be officially shut down in July 2021. The decision to shut down LG Mobile came about from poor sales caused by stiff competition from rival Samsung and Chinese brands such as Oppo and Xiaomi. LG became the first major smartphone brand to completely withdraw from the market.

===== Smart watches =====
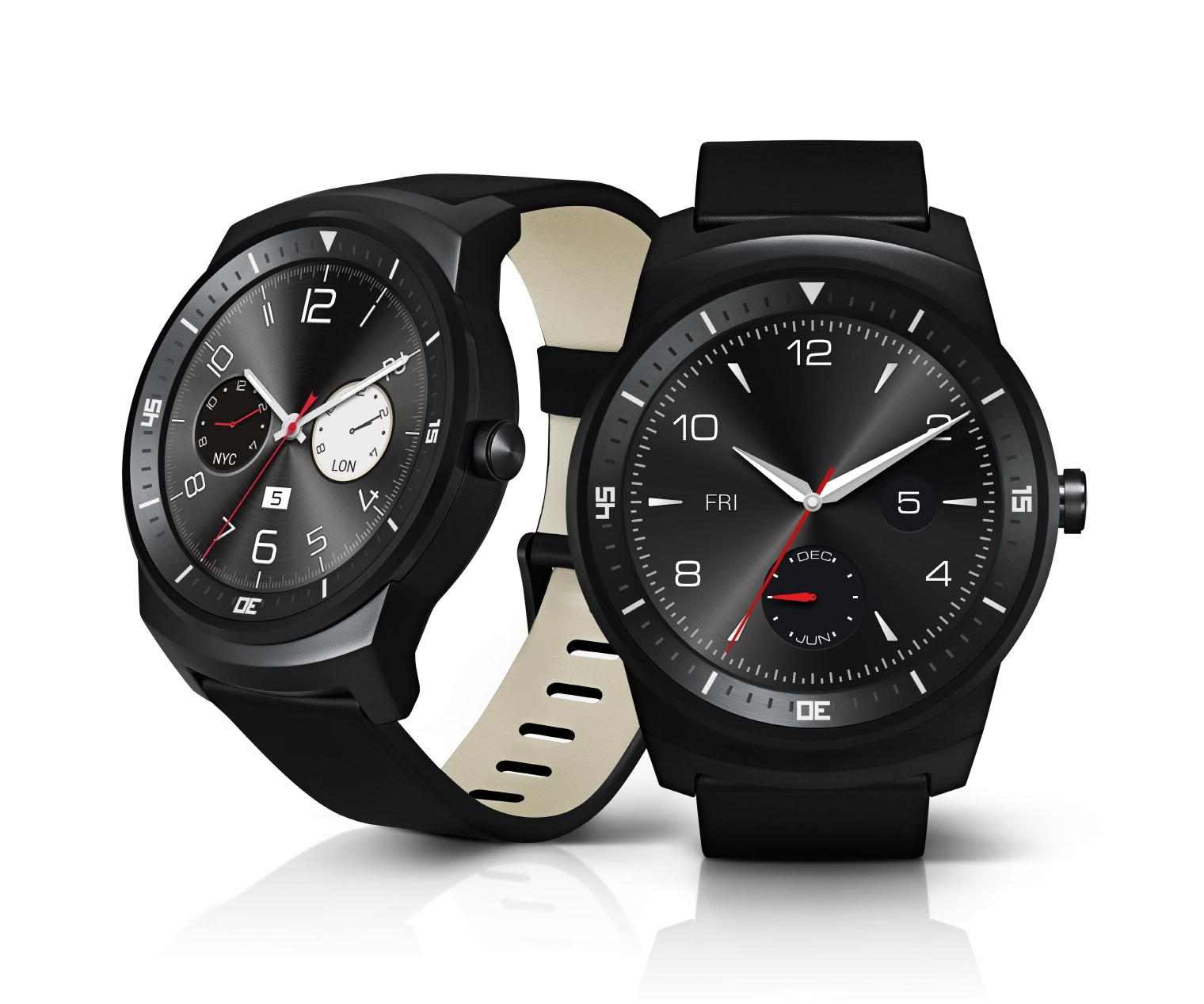
LG G Watch R

LG and Google announced the Android Wear-based smartwatch, the LG G Watch, that was in June 2014. In August 2014, the LG G Watch R that has a circular face (similar to the Moto 360) was released. The LG Watch Urbane that LG's third Android Wear-based smart watch has released in April 2015. This was the first device to support newer smartwatch features such as Wi-Fi, and new parts of Android Wear's software interface, like the ability to draw emoji to friends.

===== Rolly keyboard =====
In 2015, LG announced a Bluetooth keyboard that folds up along the four rows of keys for portability. The Rolly keyboard is made of solid plastic. Two tiny plastic arms fold out from the end of the keyboard to support a tablet or smartphone and it can toggle between two different Bluetooth-connected devices at a time. Battery life is an expected three months on a single AAA battery.

== Competitive position: innovation ==
In 2021, the World Intellectual Property Organization (WIPO)'s annual World Intellectual Property Indicators report ranked LG's number of patent applications published under the PCT System as 4th in the world, with 2,759 patent applications being published during 2020. This position is an impressive increase from its previous ranking as 10th in 2019 with 1,646 applications.

In 2023, the World Intellectual Property Organization (WIPO)'s Annual PCT Review ranked LG Electronics's number of patent applications published under the PCT System as 6th in the world, with 1,887 patent applications being published during 2023.

In 2024 LG's number of designs in industrial design registrations published under the Hague System was ranked as 4th in the world, with 352 design registrations being published during 2023.

== Marketing and public relations ==
=== Sponsorships ===
LG Sports Limited, a subsidiary of LG Corporation, owns the Korean Baseball Organisation (KBO) LG Twins (LG 트윈스). Through an acquisition in 1990, the MBC Blue Dragons (who was one of the six original founding members of the KBO in 1982) became the LG Twins. The team has won two Korean Series (1990 and 1994). LG attracts a large attendance of fans and to much of their enjoyment, took third place in the league.

In August 2013, LG Electronics announced that it would sponsor German Bundesliga club Bayer 04 Leverkusen for the next three years with an option to extend for one more year. LG sponsors the International Cricket Council, the world governing body for cricket and also sponsors the ICC Awards.

From 2009 to 2013, LG Electronics sponsored Formula One as a Global Partner and Technology Partner. LG was also an official supplier to Virgin Racing and Lotus Racing team, plus engine manufacturer Cosworth from 2010 to 2012. LG also sponsors London Fashion Week and the LG Arena in Birmingham.

During the period 2001–2003, LG sponsored the snooker Grand Prix. During these years the tournament was known as the LG Cup. In 2008, LG became sponsors of the Extreme Sport 'FSO4 Freeze' festival.

The LG Electronics company in Australia dissolved its sponsorship with cricketer David Warner on 27 March 2018 and dropped him as the brand ambassador of the company over the ball tampering scandal during the third Test of their 2017–18 tempestuous series against South Africa. Warner had an agreement with the company in 2014 and his contract had been planned for renewal.

== Controversies ==
In 2010, independent tests of popular LG fridge models conducted by Choice magazine found the energy consumption in two models was higher than claimed by LG. LG was aware of the problem and offered compensation to affected customers. In 2004, LG made 4A-rated water efficiency claims for numerous washing machines before they were certified. LG gave undertakings to the Australian Competition & Consumer Commission to provide appropriate corrective notices and upgrade and maintain its trade practices compliance program. In 2006, LG overstated energy efficiency on five of its air conditioner models and was again required to offer consumers rebates to cover the extra energy costs.

In 2026, LG's end-user license agreement for their smart TVs included a notice that the device may record and analyze voices for its AI-based features. To comply with wiretapping laws, it requests users to notify their household members and guests that the device may be recording voices. Furthermore, it was discovered by YouTube channel Gamers Nexus that some LG smart TVs may be recording and processing background audio and scan for other devices on LAN even when in standby mode or disconnected from the internet. However, LG denied such claims in response, claiming that they only process audio when a wake word of a voice command is detected, and that its ability to scan for other devices on the network is "a standard function commonly available on smart TVs and smart home devices".

== Slogans ==
- "We Put People First" (1997–1999)
- "Digitally Yours" (1999–2004)
- "A Better Life with Digital" (2002–2004)
- "Life's Good" (1999–present in Australia and 2004–present globally) LG's brand slogan, "Life's Good", originated in the company's Australian office in the late 1990s and was later adopted more widely across LG's branding.
- "Innovation for a Better Life" (2016–present)

== See also ==
- Electric vehicle charging industry of South Korea
- LG Uplus
- Tech companies in the New York metropolitan area
