= Picadilly Star =

Building in Taguig, Philippines

Coordinates: 14°33′00″N 121°02′46″E

The Picadilly Star is a high-rise 26-storey building located in Bonifacio Global City in Taguig, Philippines.

== Design ==
Picadilly Star has Variable Refrigerant Flow (VRF) air conditioning and is supported by 100% back-up power. The building has eight parking levels, five-passenger lifts, one service lift, and different rooms for the businesses stationed there.

It is PEZA-accredited and classified as a Grade-A building. Picadilly Star has a total floor area of 1,650 square meters.
