= LG Styler =

LG Styler is a cabinet style garment care aplpiance produced by LG Electronics. It uses steam, moving hangers and drying cycles to refresh garments, reduce odors and wrinkles, and dry delicate or damp items.

The Styler was first released in South Korea in 2011 after nine years of development. It was later introduced in international markets including the United States, China, Germany, and Japan.

The appliance belongs to a category of cabinet style garment care products commonly described as steam closets or steam wardrobes. It supplements conventional garment care as it refreshens lightly worn clothing and reduce odors and wrinkles, but does not remove stains or replace washing, ironing or professional dry cleaning.

== History ==
LG Electronics released the Styler in South Korea in 2011 after a nine year development process. The appliance combined steam with moving hangers inside a cabinet style enclosure to refresh garments and reduce ordors and wrinkles.

The Styler appeared at CES in 2015. At the event, LG presented it as a steam based appliance intended to reduce odors and allergens and loosen wrinkles in clothing.

The Styler was introduced in Japan in 2017. By 2019, it was sold through about 900 stores, including Bic Camera locations. LG reported that Japanese sales doubled in 2018 and increased by 50 percent year on year during the first five months of 2019. The company associated interest in the appliance with its pollen removal and dehumidification functions.

The Styler became available in the United Kingdom in 2020. The model sold there included refresh, sanitize and gentle dry cycles, as well as downloadable programs for particular fabrics and uses.

Cumulative production of Korean market Tromm Styler models passed one million units in 2021. At the time, LG sold the product in more than 20 countries. In 2026, LG reported that cumulative worldwide sales had exceeded two million units and that the Styler was sold in 27 countries.

== Design and features ==
Styler models are built as tall, narrow cabinets and use refillable clean water and drain water reservoirs, allowing them to operate without a direct water line connection. Garments are placed on moving hangers that agitate during operation while steam circulates through the cabinet. Models generally include a removable shelf, while some also include a trouser press.

The shelf can be used for items that cannot be hung, including shoes, pillows, toys and small fabric items. Available programs vary by model and include garment refreshing, sanitizing and gentle drying. The appliance is intended primarily for lightly worn, delicate or difficult to wash items rather than heavily soiled clothing.

Some Styler models connect to the LG ThinQ application, allowing users to operate the appliance remotely and download additional cycles for particular fabrics or uses.

LG announced a redesigned Styler at CES in 2024. The updated model added a handheld pressure steamer, a moving hanger system that twisted garments as well as moving them from side to side, and an LCD control panel. It also included additional garment care programs, a room ventilation system and a dehumidifier.

== Related products ==
LG later extended the Styler name to Styler ShoeCare, separate cabinet appliance intended to refresh and dry footwear. ShoeCare uses steam and an adjustable nozzle system that directs air into the shoes. Its standard cycle can accommodate up to four pairs.

== Recognition and certification ==
in 2018, the Styler received asthma & allergy friendly certification from the Asthma and Allergy Foundation of America and Allergy Standards Limited. Certification testing assessed its ability to reduce house dust mites and reduce bacteria and fungi by at least 99 percent. Testing also required the appliance not to increase surrounding humidity by more than five percent or disperse water contaminated with bacteria and fungi.
