= LG Gram =

Series of laptop computers by LG Electronics

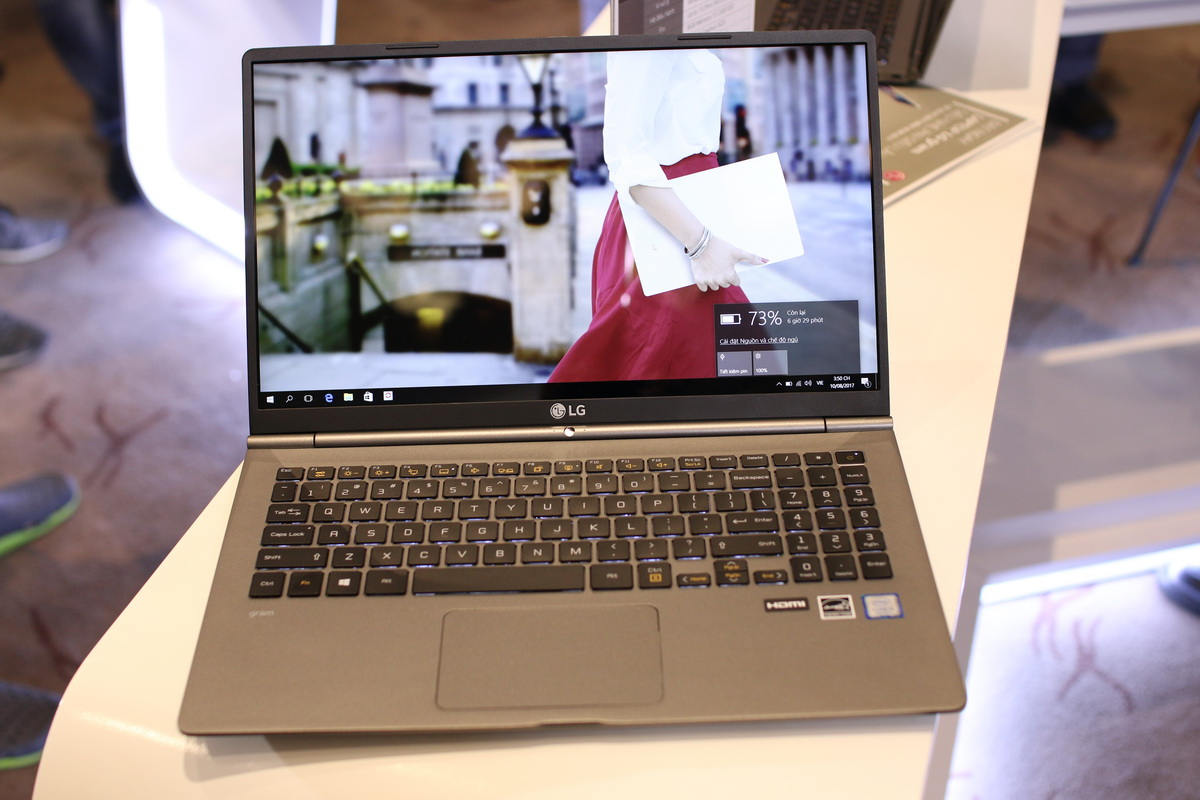
- 17" LG Gram (2018 model)
- Developer: LG
- Manufacturer: LG
- Type: Laptop
- Released: 2014; 12 years ago
- Operating system: Windows / Linux
- CPU: AMD, Intel
- Graphics: AMD, Nvidia
- Marketing target: Consumer
- Website: www.lg.com/us/laptops

The LG Gram (stylized LG gram) is a line of consumer-oriented high-end laptop computers manufactured by LG Electronics, designed to be lightweight.

== Models ==
The first Gram was released domestically in South Korea, called the 13Z940 and marketed as the LG Ultra PC Gram. It was made official in January 2014 and weighed only 980 grams. A 14-inch version (14Z950) was introduced at CES 2015. The 14 Gram proved popular in South Korea, exceeding 50,000 sales as of May 22.

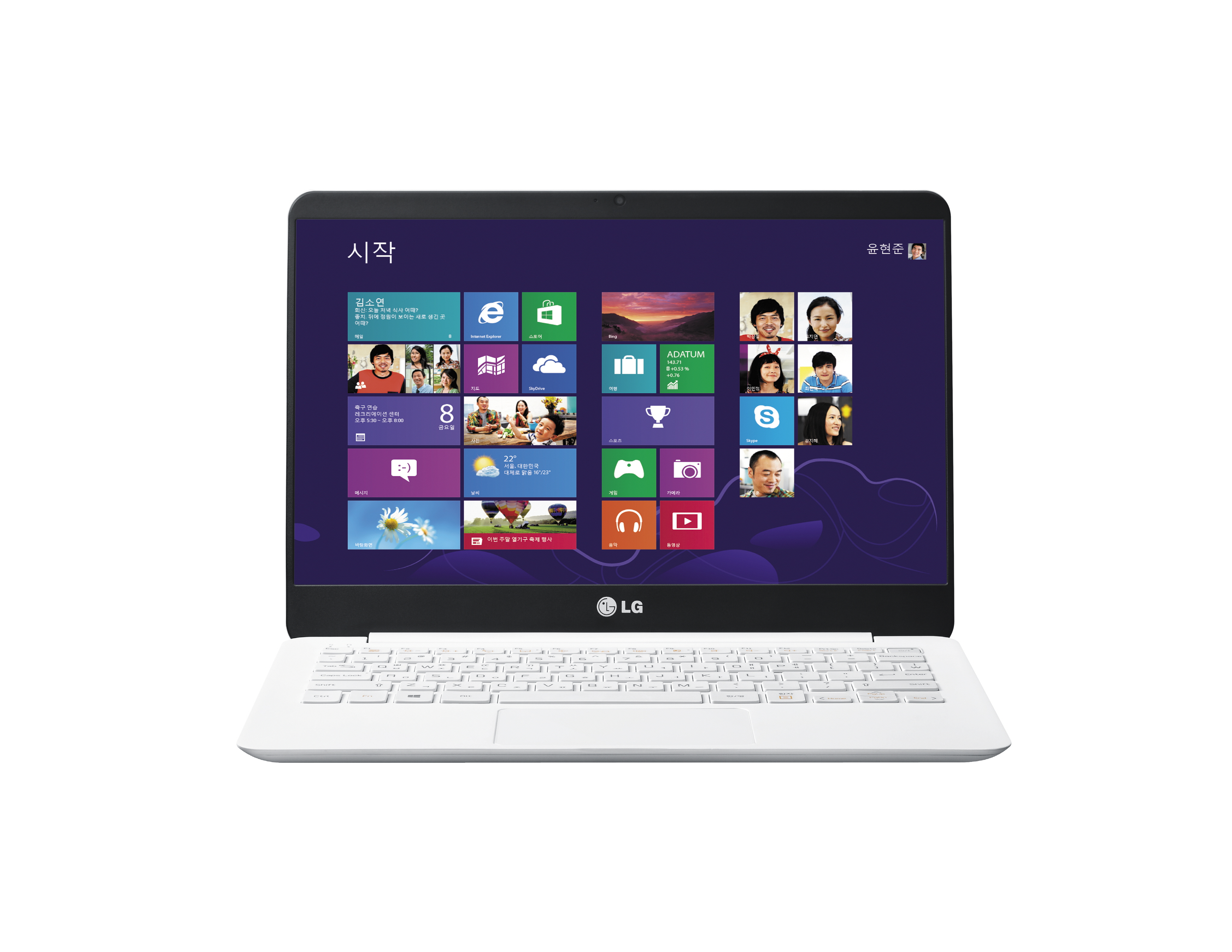
Original LG Gram Ultra PC

The Gram was announced internationally in September 2015 with two screen sizes available: 13.3" and 14". They were the first LG laptops to be released in the US. A 15.6" model was introduced during CES 2016. It was recognized as the lightest 15-inch laptop in the world.

During CES 2017, the 2017 edition of the Gram was introduced. During CES 2018, the 2018 edition of the Gram was introduced. During CES 2019, a larger 17" Gram alongside a 14" 2-in-1 Gram was introduced.

During CES 2021, a larger 16" Gram alongside a 16" 2-in-1 Gram was introduced.

In April 2022, the updated 2022 line-up of Gram was announced, which run on 12th generation Intel Core. Additionally, these come with the newer LPDDR5 type of RAM, and for the first time offer optional NVIDIA video cards for improved graphical performance.

The 2023 Gram models are upgraded to 13th generation Raptor Lake Intel Core processors and variable refresh rate displays.

In December 2023 and at CES 2024, LG announced the next generation Grams, with the new flagship being called the Gram Pro (in 16" and 17") and the convertible Gram Pro 2-in-1. The regular Gram line has also been upgraded.

=== Gram SuperSlim, Style, +View ===
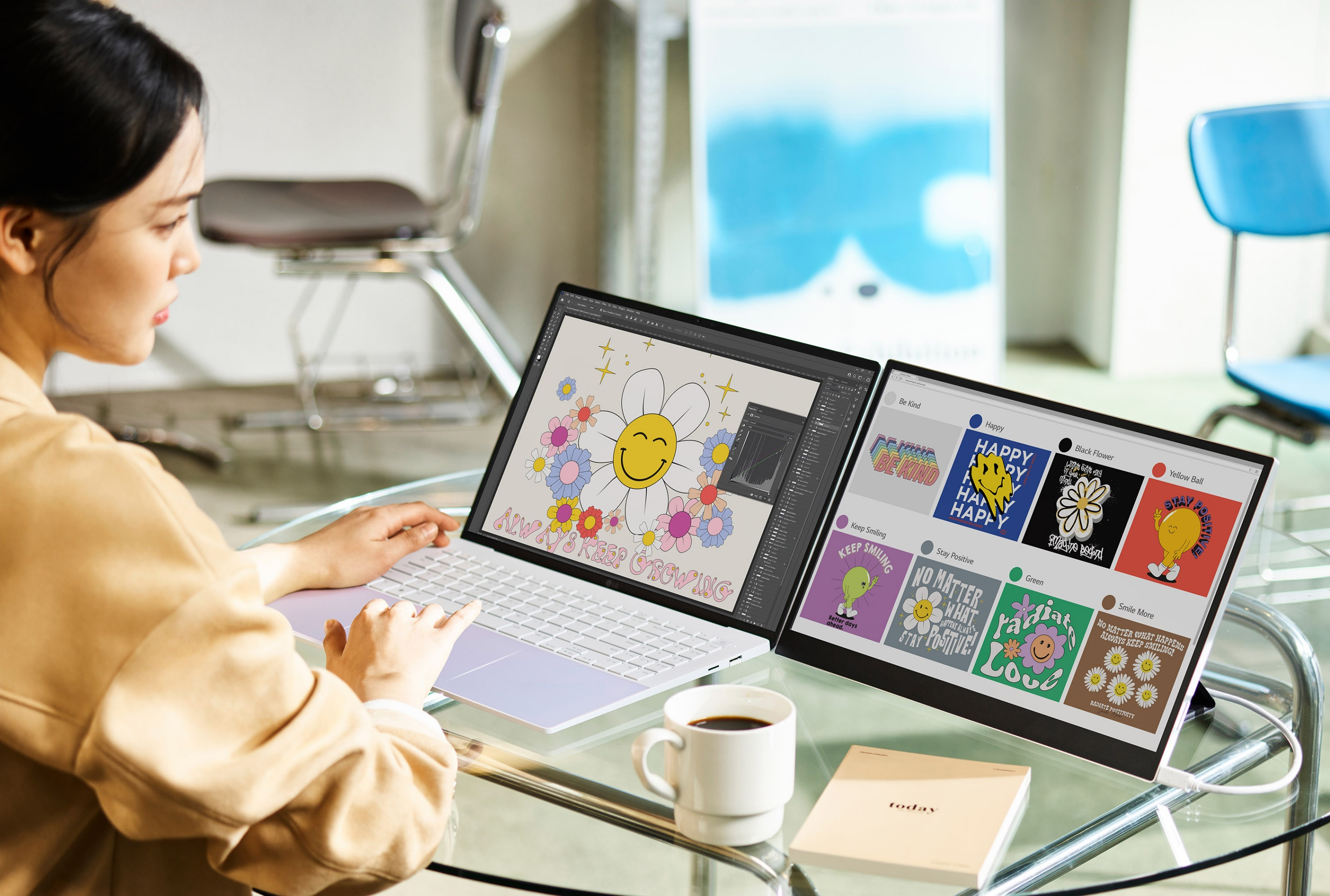
The 2023 LG gram Style laptop alongside the +View portable monitor.

The line was diversified with the LG Gram 2-in-1 in 2019. More 2-in-1 laptops in 14 and 16-inch versions were introduced in 2021.

At CES 2023, two new models of the Gram were introduced: Gram SuperSlim and Gram Style. The Gram SuperSlim was called the thinnest laptop at just 0.43 inches thick. The LG Gram Style meanwhile appears to change exterior color depending on angle and lighting. The LG Gram +View portable monitor was released in 2022. In August 2023, an updated Gram +View was announced.

== Reception and marketing ==
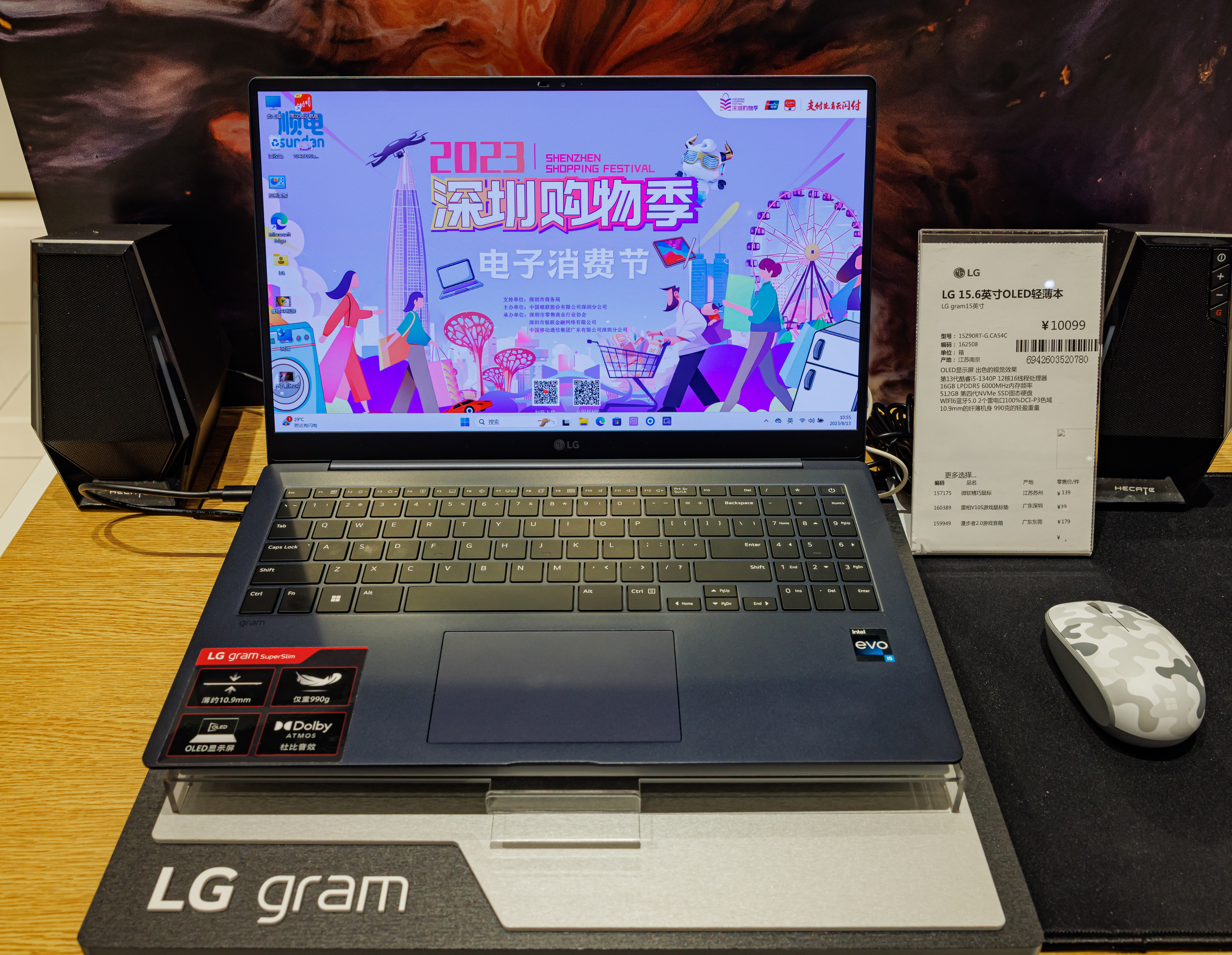
LG Gram 15Z90RT

LG's marketing of the Gram emphasizes its light weight. In 2016, no configuration weighted more than 980 grams.

== Comparison of Gram models ==
=== Gram ===
Model		2015	2016	2017	2018	2019	2020	2021	2022	2023	2024	2025
Model		Z950	Z960	Z970	Z980	Z990	Z90N	Z90P	Z90Q	Z90R	Z90S	Z90T
Display	13"	13.3”, 1920 × 1080 (16:9), 165.63 ppi IPS LCD (13)	—N/a	13.3”, 1920 × 1080 (16:9), 165.63 ppi IPS LCD (13)		—N/a	—N/a	—N/a	—N/a	—N/a	-	
Display	14"	14”, 1920 × 1080 (16:9), 157.35 ppi IPS LCD (14)	—N/a	14”, 1920 × 1080 (16:9), 157.35 ppi IPS LCD (14)		14", 1920 x 1080 (16:9), 157.35 ppi IPS LCD		14", 1920 x 1200 (16:10), 161.73 ppi IPS LCD				
Display	15"	—N/a	15.6”, 1920 × 1080 (16:9), 141.21 ppi IPS LCD (15)			15.6", 1920 x 1080 (16:9), 141.21ppi IPS LCD		15.6", 1920 x 1080 (16:9), 141.21ppi IPS LCD				
Display	16"	—N/a	—N/a	—N/a	—N/a	—N/a	—N/a	16", 2560 × 1600 (16:10), 188.68 ppi IPS LCD				
Display	17"	—N/a	—N/a	—N/a	—N/a	17", 2560 x 1600 (16:10), 177.58 ppi IPS LCD						17"
Processor	Lower spec	2.2 GHz dual-core Intel Core i5 Broadwell (i5-5200U), up to 2.7 GHz, 3 MB L3 cache	2.3 GHz dual-core Intel Core i5 Skylake (i5-6200U), up to 2.8 GHz, 3 MB L3 cache	2.5 GHz dual-core Intel Core i5 Kaby Lake (i5-7200U), up to 3.1 GHz, 3 MB L3 cache	1.6 GHz quad-core Intel Core i5 Kaby Lake R (i5-8250U), up to 3.4 GHz, 6 MB L3 cache	1.6 GHz quad-core Intel Core i5 Whiskey Lake (i5-8265U), up to 3.9 GHz, 6 MB L3 cache	1.2 GHz quad-core Intel Core i5 Ice Lake (i5-1035G7), up to 3.7 GHz, 6 MB L3 cache	2.4 GHz quad-core Intel Core i5 Tiger Lake (i5-1135G7), up to 4.2 GHz, 8 MB L3 cache	12 core (4P + 8E) Intel Core i5 Alder Lake (i5-1240P), P-core from 1.7 GHz up to 4.4 GHz, E-core from 1.2 GHz up to 3.3 GHz, 12 MB L3 cache	12 core (4P + 8E) Intel Core i5 Raptor Lake (i5-1340P)		
Processor	Higher spec	2.4 GHz dual-core Intel Core i7 Broadwell (i7-5500U), up to 3.0 GHz, 4 MB L3 cache	2.5 GHz dual-core Intel Core i7 Skylake (i7-6500U), up to 3.1 GHz, 4 MB L3 cache	2.7 GHz dual-core Intel Core i7 Kaby Lake (i7-7500U), up to 3.5 GHz, 4 MB L3 cache	1.8 GHz quad-core Intel Core i7 Kaby Lake R (i7-8550U), up to 4.0 GHz, 8 MB L3 cache	1.8 GHz quad-core Intel Core i7 Whiskey Lake (i7-8565U), up to 4.6 GHz, 8 MB L3 cache	1.3 GHz quad-core Intel Core i7 Ice Lake (i7-1065G7), up to 3.9 GHz, 8 MB L3 cache	2.8 GHz quad-core Intel Core i7 Tiger Lake (i7-1165G7), up to 4.7 GHz, 12 MB L3 cache	12 core (4P + 8E) Intel Core i7 Alder Lake (i7-1260P), P-core from 2.1 GHz up to 4.7 GHz, E-core from 1.5 GHz up to 3.4 GHz, 18 MB L3 cache	12 core (4P + 8E) Intel Core i7 Raptor Lake (i7-1360P)		
Graphics	Standard	Intel HD Graphics 5500	Intel HD Graphics 520	Intel HD Graphics 620			Intel Iris Plus Graphics	Intel Iris Xe Graphics				
Graphics	Option	—N/a	—N/a	—N/a	—N/a	—N/a	—N/a	—N/a	NVIDIA RTX 2050 with 4 GB (GDDR6)	NVIDIA RTX 3050 with 4 GB (GDDR6)		
Memory		8 GB 1600 MHz DDR3L		8 GB	16 GB 2400 MHz DDR4		16 GB 3200 MHz DDR4	16 GB 4266 MHz LPDDR4X	16 GB 5200 MHz LPDDR5 or 32 GB 5200Mhz LPDDR5			
Storage		128 GB or 256 GB SSD	256 GB or 512 GB SSD	256 GB	256 GB or 512 GB or 1 TB SSD			512GB or 1TB or 2TB SSD				
Connectivity	Wi-Fi	Intel Dual Band Wireless-AC 7260 (802.11 agn/ac 2x2)	Intel Dual Band Wireless-AC 7265 (802.11ac 2x2)				Intel Dual Band Wireless-AC AX201 Wi-Fi 6 (802.11ax 2x2)		Intel Dual Band Wireless-AC AX211 Wi-Fi 6E (802.11ax 2x2)			
Connectivity	Bluetooth	Bluetooth 4.0		Bluetooth 4.1		Bluetooth 5.0		Bluetooth 5.1				
Audio												
Video camera		1.3 megapixels	HD 720p						FHD 1080p			
Battery		2 Cell, Lithium-Polymer, 4555mAh, 34.61 Wh	2 Cell Lithium-Polymer, 6850mAh, 52.06 Wh	4 cell lithium Ion, 7792mAh, 72Wh			4 cell lithium Ion, 7792mAh, 72Wh (14", 15.6") 2 cell lithium Ion, 10336mAh, 80Wh (17")	2 cell lithium Ion, 7792mAh, 72Wh (14") 4 cell lithium Ion, 10336mAh, 80Wh (16", 17")	2 cell lithium Ion, 7792mAh, 72Wh (14") 4 cell lithium Ion, 10336mAh, 80Wh (16", 17") 4 cell lithium Ion, 10336mAh, 90Wh (16", 17" with dedicated GPU)			Battery life described as "up to 18.25 hours" and noted as "exceptional"
Peripheral connections		2x USB 3.0	1x USB 3.0, 1x USB 2.0	2x USB 3.0	3x USB 3.0	3x USB-A 3.0, 1x USB-C Thunderbolt 3	3x USB-A 3.1, 1x USB-C Thunderbolt 3	1.x USB-A 3.2, 2x USB-C 4.0	1x USB-A 3.2 x 2x USB-C 4.0			
Peripheral connections		1x SDXC MicroSD slot										
Peripheral connections		1x HDMI (Standard)						1x HDMI (v2.0)				
Peripheral connections		1x 3.5mm headphone out										
Peripheral connections		1x Micro USB port with RJ45 gender, RJ45 Ethernet	1x Type C USB port with RJ45 gender, RJ45 Ethernet									
Peripheral connections		1x DC-In						1x DC-In via USB-C				
Weight	13"	2.16 lbs (0.98 kg)	—N/a	2.07 lbs (0.939 kg)	2.13 lbs (0.965 kg)	—N/a	—N/a	—N/a	—N/a			
Weight	14"	2.16 lbs (0.98 kg)	—N/a	2.14 lbs (0.9971 kg)	2.19 lbs (0.994 kg)	2.19 lbs (0.995 kg)	2.2 lbs (0.999 kg)	2.2 lbs (0.999 kg)	2.2 lbs (0.999 kg)			
Weight	15"	—N/a	2.4 lbs (1.089 kg)	2.40 lbs (1.090 kg)	2.41 lbs (1.095 kg)	2.41 lbs (1.095 kg)	2.42 lbs (1.099 kg)	—N/a	2.54 lbs (1.152 kg)			
Weight	16"	—N/a	—N/a	—N/a	—N/a	—N/a	—N/a	2.64 lbs (1.199 kg)				
Weight	17"	—N/a	—N/a	—N/a	—N/a	2.95 lbs (1.340 kg)	2.98 lbs (1.350 kg)	2.98 lbs (1.350 kg)				
Dimensions (width × depth × height)	13"	11.9 x 8.4 x 0.5 inches / 30.22 x 21.33 x 1.27 cm	—N/a	12.1 x 8.3 x 0.6 inches / 30.7 x 21.08 x 1.52 cm	12 x 8.3 x 0.6 inches / 30.5 x 21.08 x 1.52 cm	—N/a	—N/a	—N/a	—N/a	—N/a		
Dimensions (width × depth × height)	14"	12.8 x 8.9 x 0.5 inches / 32.51 x 22.6 x 1.27 cm	—N/a	12.7 x 8.3 x 0.6 inches / 32.26 x 21.08 x 1.52 cm	12.7 x 8.3 x 0.6 inches / 32.26 x 21.08 x 1.52 cm	12.7 x 8.3 x 0.7 inches / 32.26 x 21.08 x 1.78 cm	12.7 x 8.3 x 0.7 inches / 32.26 x 21.08 x 1.78 cm	12.34 x 8.47 x 0.66 inches / 31.34 x 21.51 x 1.68 cm	12.28 x 8.42 x 0.66 inches / 31.20 x 21.39 x 1.68 cm			
Dimensions (width × depth × height)	15"	—N/a	14.08 x 8.99 x 0.66 inches / 35.76 x 22.83 x 1.67 cm	14.1 x 9 x 0.6 inches / 35.81 x 22.86 x 1.52 cm	14.1 x 9 x 0.7 inches / 35.81 x 22.86 x 1.78 cm	14.1 x 9 x 0.7 inches / 35.81 x 22.86 x 1.78 cm	14.1 x 9 x 0.7 inches / 35.81 x 22.86 x 1.78 cm	—N/a	14.02 x 8.78 x 0.69 inches / 35.61 x 22.29 x 1.74 cm			
Dimensions (width × depth × height)	16"	—N/a	—N/a	—N/a	—N/a	—N/a	—N/a	14.01 x 9.58 x 0.66 inches / 35.59 x 24.33 x 1.68 cm	13.96 x 9.53 x 0.66 inches / 35.45 x 24.21 x 1.68 cm			
Dimensions (width × depth × height)	17"	—N/a	—N/a	—N/a	—N/a	15 x 10.3 x 0.7 inches / 38.1 x 26.16 x 1.78 cm	15 x 10.3 x 0.7 inches / 38.1 x 26.16 x 1.78 cm	14.97 x 10.24 x 0.7 inches / 38.02 x 26.01 x 1.78 cm	14.91 x 10.18 x 0.7 inches / 37.88 x 25.88 x 1.77 cm			

=== Gram Pro ===
Model	Year	2024
Model	Model no.	Z90S
Display	16"	2560 x 1600 (16:10), IPS LCD
Display	17"	2560 x 1600 (16:10), IPS LCD
Processor		Intel Core Ultra Meteor Lake
Graphics		
Memory		Up to 32 GB
Storage		
Connectivity	Wi-Fi	
Connectivity	Bluetooth	

=== Gram 2-in-1 ===
Model	Year	2019	2020	2021	2022	2023
Model	Model no.	T990	T90N	T90P	T90Q	T90R
Display	14"	1920×1080 (16:9) IPS LCD		1920x1200 (16:10), IPS LCD		
Display	15"	—N/a	—N/a	—N/a	—N/a	—N/a
Display	16"	—N/a	—N/a	2560x1600 (16:10), IPS LCD		
Processor				2.8 GHz quad-core Intel Core i7 Tiger Lake (i7-1165G7), up to 4.7 GHz, 12 MB L3 cache		
Graphics						
Memory				16 GB 3200 MHz DDR4		
Storage						
Connectivity	Wi-Fi					
Connectivity	Bluetooth					

=== Gram Pro 2-in-1 ===
Model	Year	2024
Model	Model no.	16T90SP
Display	16"	WQXGA+
Processor		Intel Core Ultra Meteor Lake
Graphics		
Memory		Up to 32 GB
Storage		
Connectivity	Wi-Fi	
Connectivity	Bluetooth	

=== Gram SuperSlim and Style ===
Model	Series	Gram SuperSlim	Gram Style
Model	Year	2023	
Model	Model no.	Z90RT	Z90RS
Display	14"	—N/a	2880x1800 (16:10) OLED
Display	15"	1920 × 1080 (16:9) OLED	—N/a
Display	16"	—N/a	3200 x 2000 (16:10) OLED
Processor			
Graphics			
Memory			
Storage			
Connectivity	Wi-Fi		
Connectivity	Bluetooth		
