= LG Multi V Series =

Multi V is a product line of variable refrigerant flow (VRF) systems manufactured by LG Electronics for commercial heating and cooling applications.

The range includes heat pump and heat recover systems. Heat pump systems provide either heating or cooling to the connected zones, while heat recovery systems can heat and cool different zones at the same time. A Multi V installation connects one or more outdoor units to multiple indoor units through a shared refrigerant circuit. The indoor units can be controlled separately, allowing different ares of a building to maintain different temperatures.

== Development ==
LG introduced the first Multi V system in 2006, followed by Multi V II in 2008, Multi V III in 2010 and Multi V IV in 2013. The first model used an AC inverter and R410A refrigerant, while Multi V II adopted a DC inverter. Multi V III added high pressure oil return, vapor injection and continuous heating. Multi V IV introduced active refrigerant control, a variable heat exchanger circuit and revised load and oil management systems.

Multi V 5 was launched in 2017 with a three pipe heat recovery system and changes to its compressor, outdoor unit fan, heat exchanger, oil management system and coil coating. It also used temperature and humidity sensors to regulate operation. Compared with the preceding generation, its outdoor units were smaller and lighter while providing increased cooling capacity. The redesign also addressed low temperature heating. Multi V 5 maintained full heating capacity at -7°C and could operate at outdoor temperatures as low as -25°C.

LG announced Multi V i in 2023 as an all electric VRF system with AI based controls. It used information including occupancy, humidity, indoor and outdoor temperatures, and weather conditions to adjust system operation. Its functions included occupancy based indoor unity control, energy consumption targets, edge computing and remote software and firmware updates.

== Design and use ==
Multi V systems connect multiple indoor units to shared outdoor equipment through refrigerant piping and a control network. Refrigerant flow is adjusted according to the heating or cooling demand of each zone, and the indoor units can be controlled separately.

In a heat pump configuration, the connected indoor units generally operate in either heating or cooling mode. In a heat recovery configuration, different zones can operate in heating and cooling modes at the same time. Heat removed from zones requiring cooling can be transferred to areas requiring heating.

Individual room controls and central controllers can be connected to a Multi V system. LG's MultiSITE platform supports schedule management, temperature settings and integration with building management systems. Outdoor air ventilation is normally provided by separate equipment, such as a dedicated outdoor air system.

Multi V installations can combine ducted and duct free indoor units connected by relatively small refrigerant lines. Case studies of Multi V IV installations reported reduced requirements for bulky ductwork, large mechanical rooms and rooftop equipment space. These characteristics have allowed the system to be used in renovation projects where interior space is limited or changes to a building's exterior are restricted, as well as in offices, hotels, multifamily housing and schools that require separate temperature control across multiple rooms or zones.

The conversion of the Chicago Motor Club building into a 143 room hotel illustrates this type of installation. The historic building had limited interior space, a small rooftop area and restrictions on exterior alterations. The limited ductwork and compact rooftop installation allowed the system to be added without major changes to the building's exterior.

== Recognition ==
Multi V III received performance certification under AHRI standard 1230, which covers published ratings for VRF air conditioning and heat pump systems.

In 2016, Multi V IV air source systems received seismic compliance certification for use in facilities including hospitals, emergency shelters and public safety buildings in the United States.

== Market Context ==
Multi V competes in the international VRF market. Other manufacturers of VRF systems include Daikin, Mitsubishi Electric, Toshiba, Samsung Electronics, Panasonic, Hitachi, Carrier and Trane. The adoption of VRF systems has been associated with energy efficiency objectives, commercial heating electrification and the need for separate temperature control in different parts of a building.

Within LG's HVAC business, Multi V forms part of the company's commercial heating and cooling portfolio. Successive generations have added heat recovery, central controls and software based system management.
