= Life's Good =

Slogan of LG Electronics

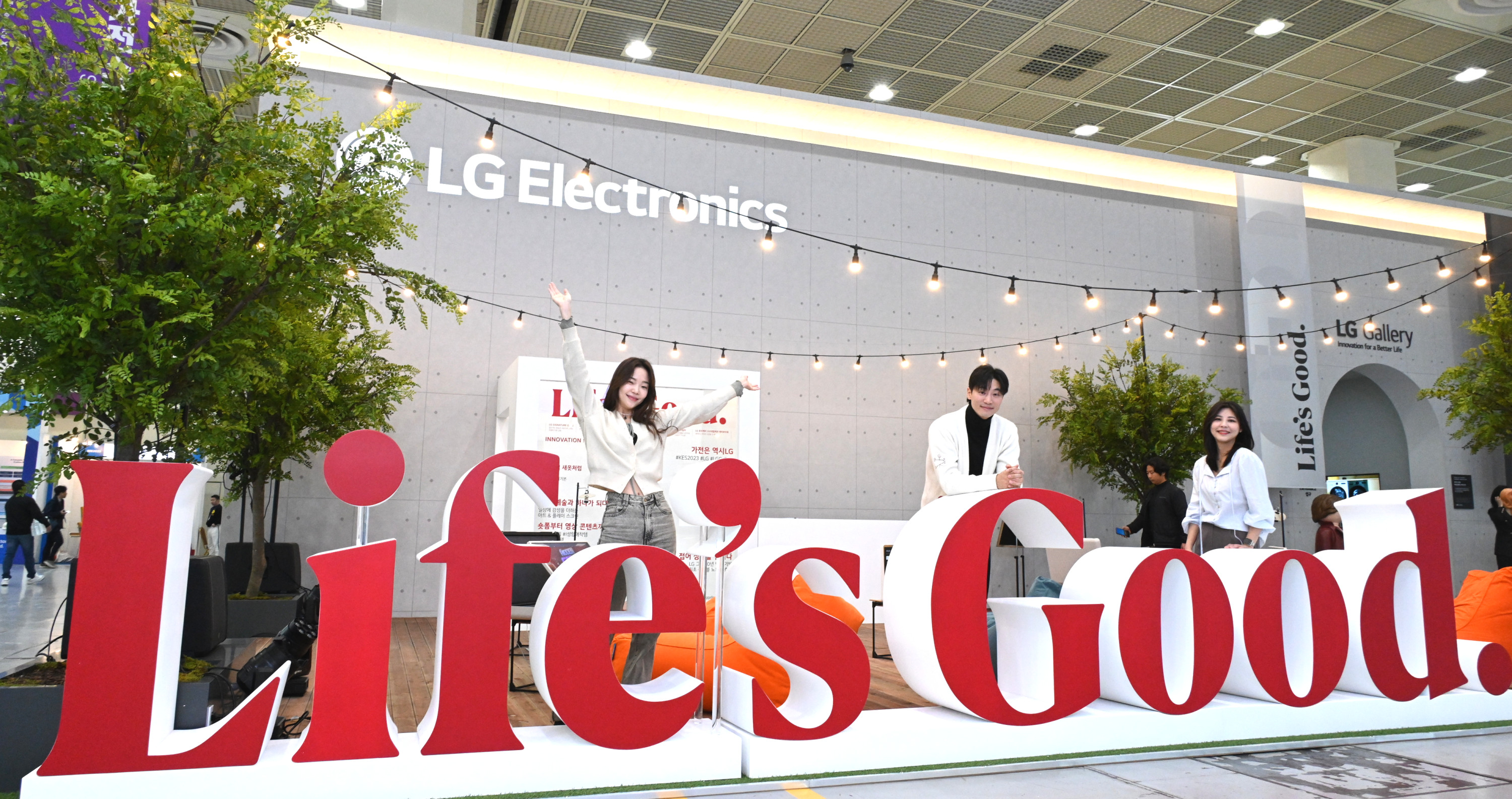
LG Electronics initiatives at KES 2023 in Seoul, South Korea.

Life's Good is a brand slogan used by LG Electronics, a South Korean consumer electronics and home appliance company. The phrase has been used as part of the company's global brand identity and advertising since the early 2000s.

== History ==
The slogan was coined by the company's Australian office around 1998. LG had limited brand recognition in Australia at the time and that local consumers mainly associated the company with low-cost products that were durable and functional. The Australian business wanted a slogan that would resonate with local consumers and communicate more than product durability or technology.

The development process as beginning with a search for words starting with the letters "L" and "G". Early candidates included phrases such as "Long Good" and "Technology, LG". According to the book, these options were set aside because they described product strengths without expressing the broader idea the team wanted to convey. The team subsequently settled on "Life's Good".

Australian trade publication Appliance Retailer has described the slogan as having been first developed by LG's Australian branch before being taken up more widely by the company. The publication reported that the phrase received a positive response in Australia before spreading beyond the local market.

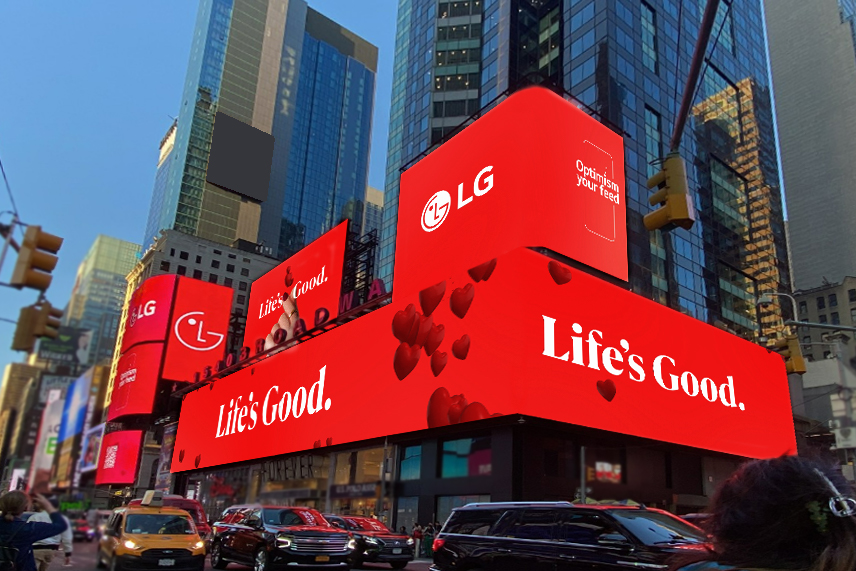
Life's Good campaign

The slogan was later incorporated into LG's global branding. "Life's Good" debuted alongside LG's Times Square billboard in New York on December 17, 2003, marking the slogan's appearance at a major international advertising location.

== Brand renewal ==
Before the 2023 renewal, LG had used variations of the slogan in advertising. In 2017, the company used the phrase "Life's Not Perfect. Life's Good" in a U.S. appliance campaign created by 72andSunny. The campaign launched during March Madness and featured LG appliances including the SideKick pedestal washer and Instaview door-in-door refrigerator.

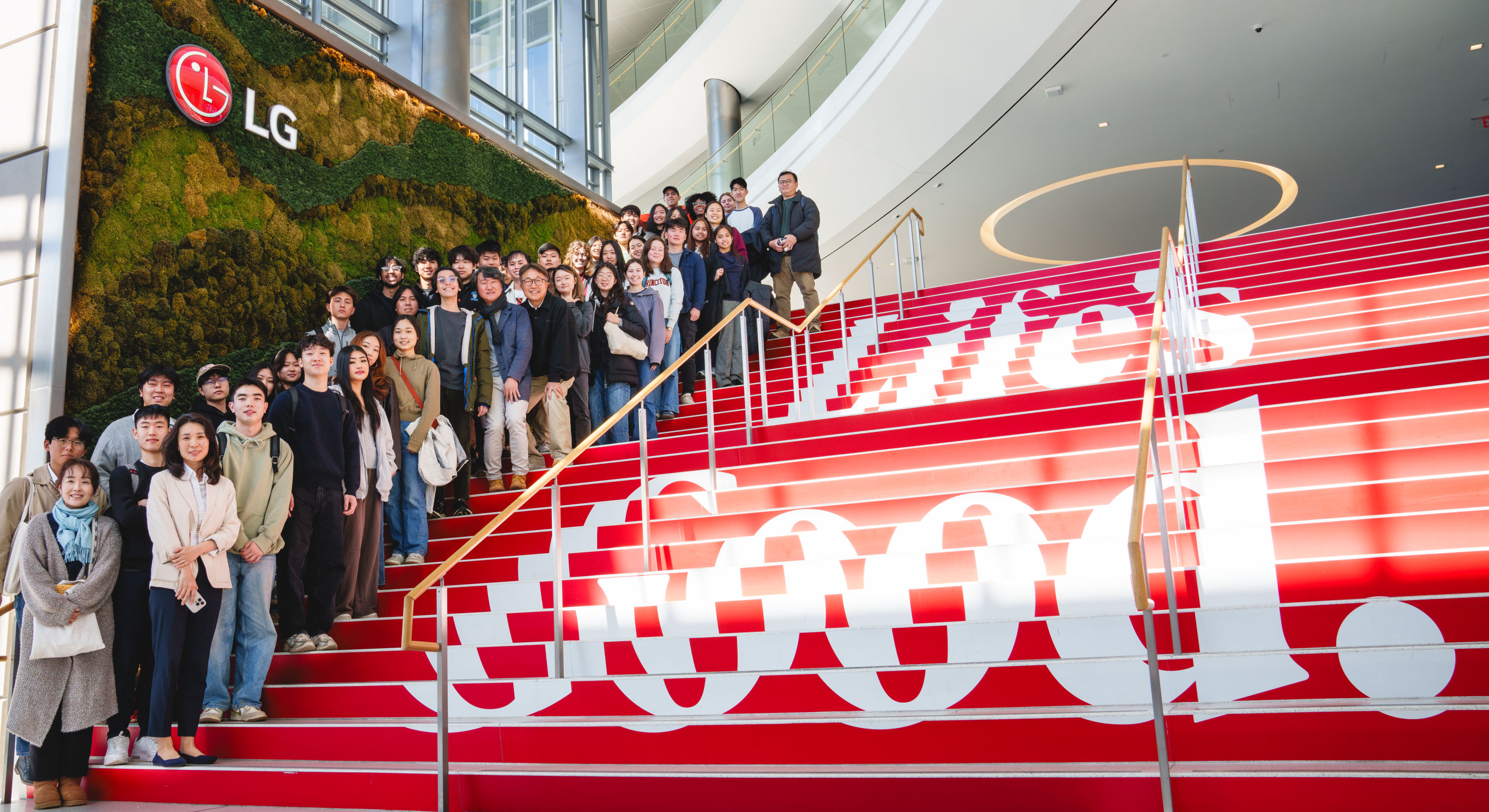
LG Electronics event featuring its technologies and the Life’s Good brand message.

In 2023, LG renewed the visual identity associated with "Life's Good" in partnership with Wolff Olins. Coverage of the refresh noted changes to the company's logo animation, colour system and typography, as well as renewed emphasis on the slogan within LG's brand identity.

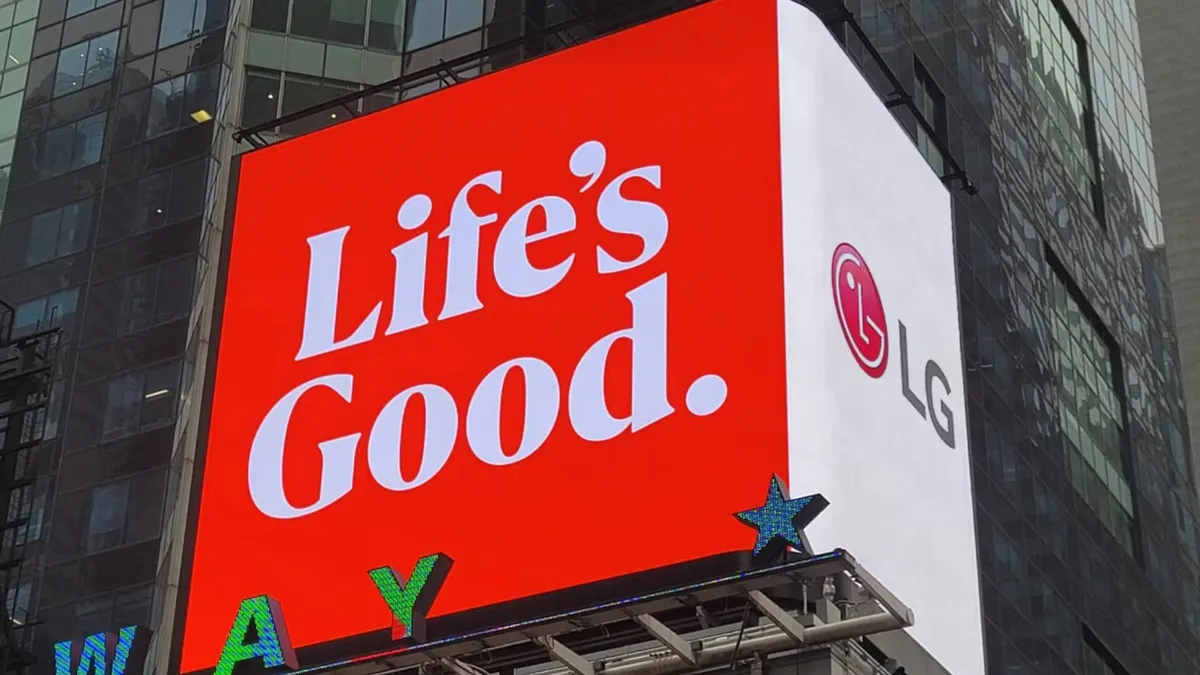
Brand Refresh Campaign By Wolff Olins (2023)

The 2023 campaign also sought to clarify the meaning of "life's Good" after around two decades of use, presenting the slogan as a message of optimism and as part of LG's stated aim of making life better through innovation.

The campaign was promoted through digital out-of-home advertising in several international cities, including New York, London, Dubai, Ho Chi Minh City and Seoul.

The renewed identity was later used in optimism-themed brand activity, including "Optimism Your Feed" in 2024 and "Radio Optimism" in 2025.

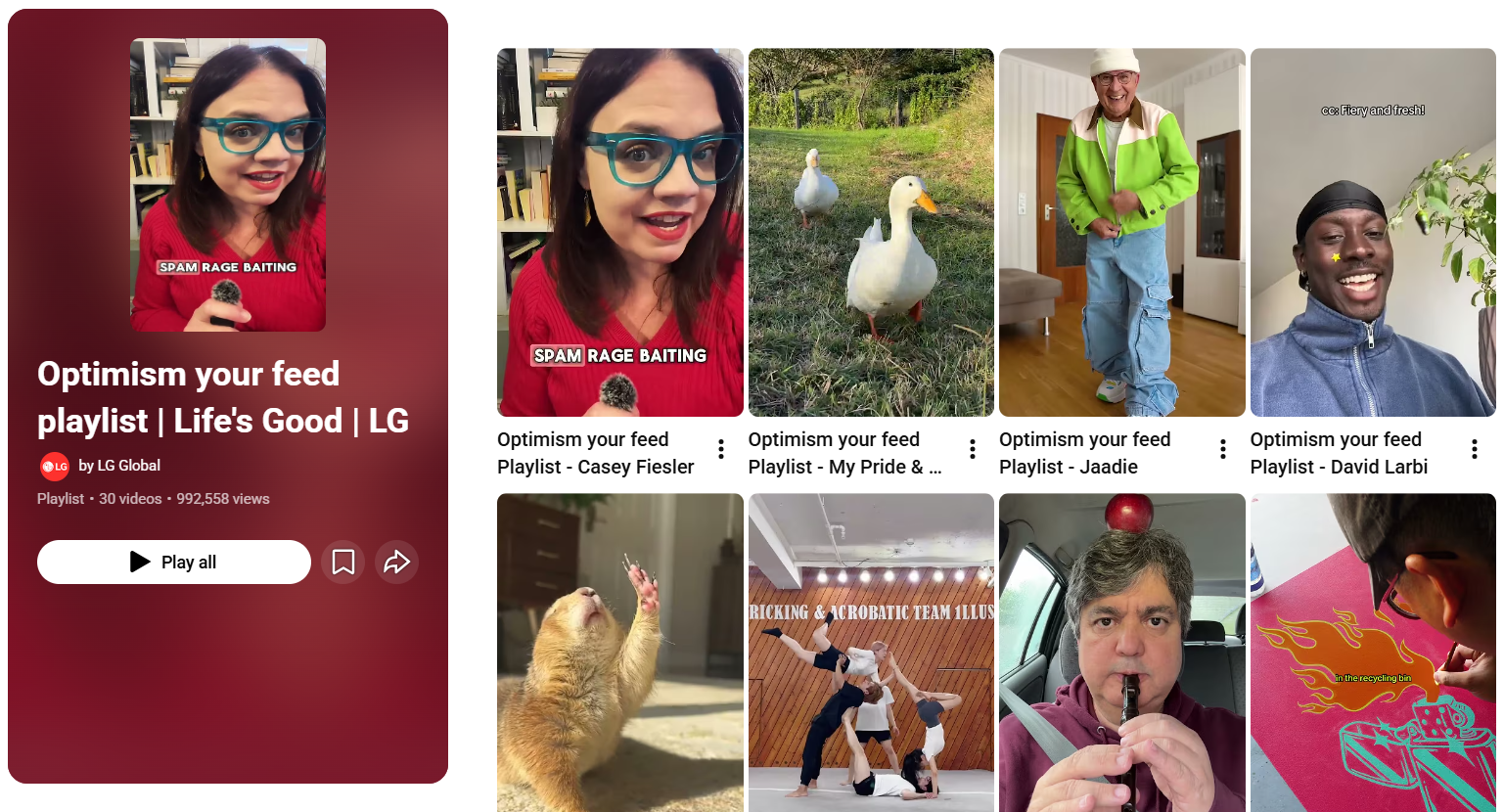
Optimism your feed campaign playlist
