= LG ThinQ =

Brand by LG Electronics

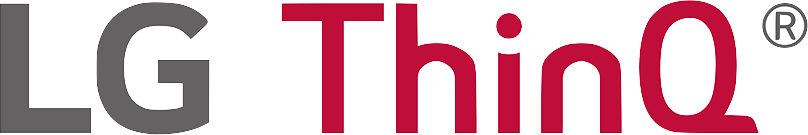
- Product type: Smart devices
- Current owner: LG Electronics
- Country: United States
- Introduced: 2025; 1 year ago (officially launched in 2017)
- Markets: Worldwide
- Website: lg.com/lg-thinq

LG ThinQ (pronounced as "think-cue"; sometimes known as LG webOS) is a smart home and artificial intelligence (AI) brand launched by LG Electronics in 2017, featuring products that are equipped with voice control and AI technology. The brand was originally launched for home appliances and consumer electronics, such as televisions, smart home devices, mobile devices, refrigerators, air conditioners and related services. The name was first used in 2011 for LG's THINQ-branded smart appliances, which were introduced at the Consumer Electronics Show in Las Vegas. In December 2017, LG announced ThinQ as a unified brand for AI-enabled home appliances, consumer electronics and services.In February 2018, LG announced the LG V30S ThinQ, which is the first phone to have the "ThinQ" branding.

== History ==
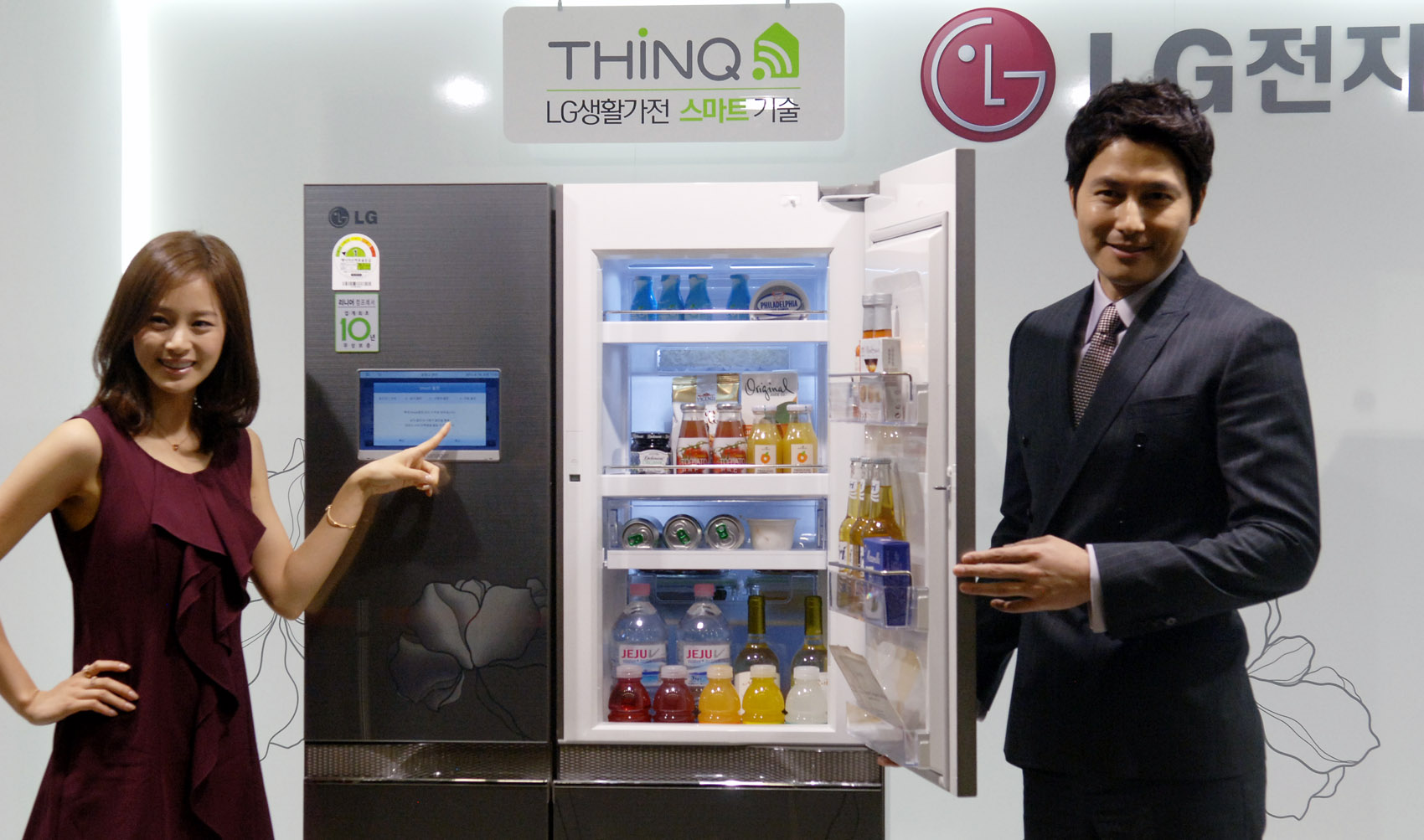
LG introducing their first lineup of THINQ products in 2011, with the former logo of the brand on the top

The branding was first introduced in 2011 in the Consumer Electronics Show (CES) in Las Vegas as THINQ. The first ThinQ product was a smart refrigerator, with features such as smart savings options, food management system, washing machine, oven and robotic vacuum cleaner and different software in the LCD screen on the fridge.

The unified branding was then officially launched as ThinQ at CES 2017 as an artificial intelligence-based brand for all their smart products. The company announced DeepThinQ, a deep-learning technology for connected products, and later opened an Artificial Intelligence Lab in Seoul to coordinate research involving voice, video, sensors and machine learning.

In December 2017, LG announced ThinQ as a brand designation for home appliances, consumer electronics, and services incorporating artificial intelligence, applied to its 2018 product lineup.

In 2018, LG extended the ThinQ brand to smartphones with the LG V30S ThinQ. The phone used ThinQ branding for AI camera features, including image recognition and shooting-mode recommendations. That year, LG also used ThinQ branding on televisions with smart-assistant features, as manufacturers increasingly added voice assistants to TV platforms.

In 2022, LG first introduced ThinQ UP, a software-upgradable appliance concept that allows compatible appliances to receive new features through the ThinQ app. The program included appliances such as refrigerators, washing machines, dryers, ovens and dishwashers, and was covered as part of a wider move toward upgradeable connected appliances.

In 2024, LG introduced ThinQ ON, an AI-powered smart home hub designed to connect LG appliances and other smart home devices. It expanded ThinQ from an appliance-control platform into a broader smart home system.

== Platform and app ==
LG ThinQ operates as a smart home platform and mobile app for connecting compatible LG appliances and consumer electronics. The app is used to control and monitor supported products, including kitchen appliances, laundry appliances, air purifiers, vacuum cleaners and televisions. Depending on the product and market, the ThinQ app can provide remote control, status monitoring, downloadable appliance cycles, diagnostic support, maintenance alerts and software-based feature updates.

In 2024, LG introduced ThinQ ON as a hub for the ThinQ platform. The device supports Matter, Thread and Wi-Fi connectivity and includes a built-in voice assistant. The Verge described the product as part of LG's effort to expand ThinQ from an appliance-control platform into a broader smart home system competing with platforms such as Samsung SmartThings and Apple Home.

== Features ==
LG ThinQ products use connected-device features, voice control to interact with users, and use sensor data and different features such as product recognition and learning engine technologies to enhance their abilities.

Deep ThinQ (or LG ThinQ AI) was introduced as LG's own AI platform. It was reported that it could engage in two-way conversations with users and could educate itself according to users' behaviour patterns and habits.

At the 2017 ThinQ launch, LG said the brand would cover products and services using artificial intelligence technologies from LG and partner companies.

ThinQ features vary by product category. On appliances, the platform may support remote operation, product-status notifications, downloaded cycles and diagnostic functions. On televisions, ThinQ branding has been associated with voice-control and smart-assistant features.

In 2018, LG ThinQ-branded TVs added support for Google Assistant and Alexa voice commands.

As of August 30, 2018, LG's ThinQ products now communicate with each other for tasks such as going to an event or following a recipe. They have sensors for communicating with other ThinQ devices and appliances.

== Products ==
LG ThinQ branding and connectivity features have been used across several LG product categories, including home appliances, televisions, air conditioners and mobile devices.

Home appliances

LG has applied ThinQ branding and app connectivity to home appliances such as refrigerators, washing machines, dryers, dishwashers, cooking appliances, air purifiers and vacuum cleaners. Through the ThinQ app, compatible appliances can be monitored or controlled remotely. Some compatible appliances can also receive downloadable cycles, diagnostic support, maintenance alerts and software-based feature updates through ThinQ UP.

Televisions and home entertainment

LG has used ThinQ branding on smart televisions and other home entertainment products. In 2018, LG ThinQ-branded televisions added support for smart-assistant voice commands, including Google Assistant.

Smartphones

- LG G6 (ThinQ branding was added to startup screen in an update)
- LG V30 (ThinQ branding was added to startup screen in an update)
- LG V30S ThinQ
- LG V35 ThinQ
- LG G7 ThinQ
- LG V40 ThinQ
- LG G8 ThinQ
- LG G8s ThinQ
- LG G8x ThinQ
- LG V50 ThinQ
- LG V60 ThinQ
- LG Velvet (Generally considered a ThinQ product in other countries)
