= LG Roboking =

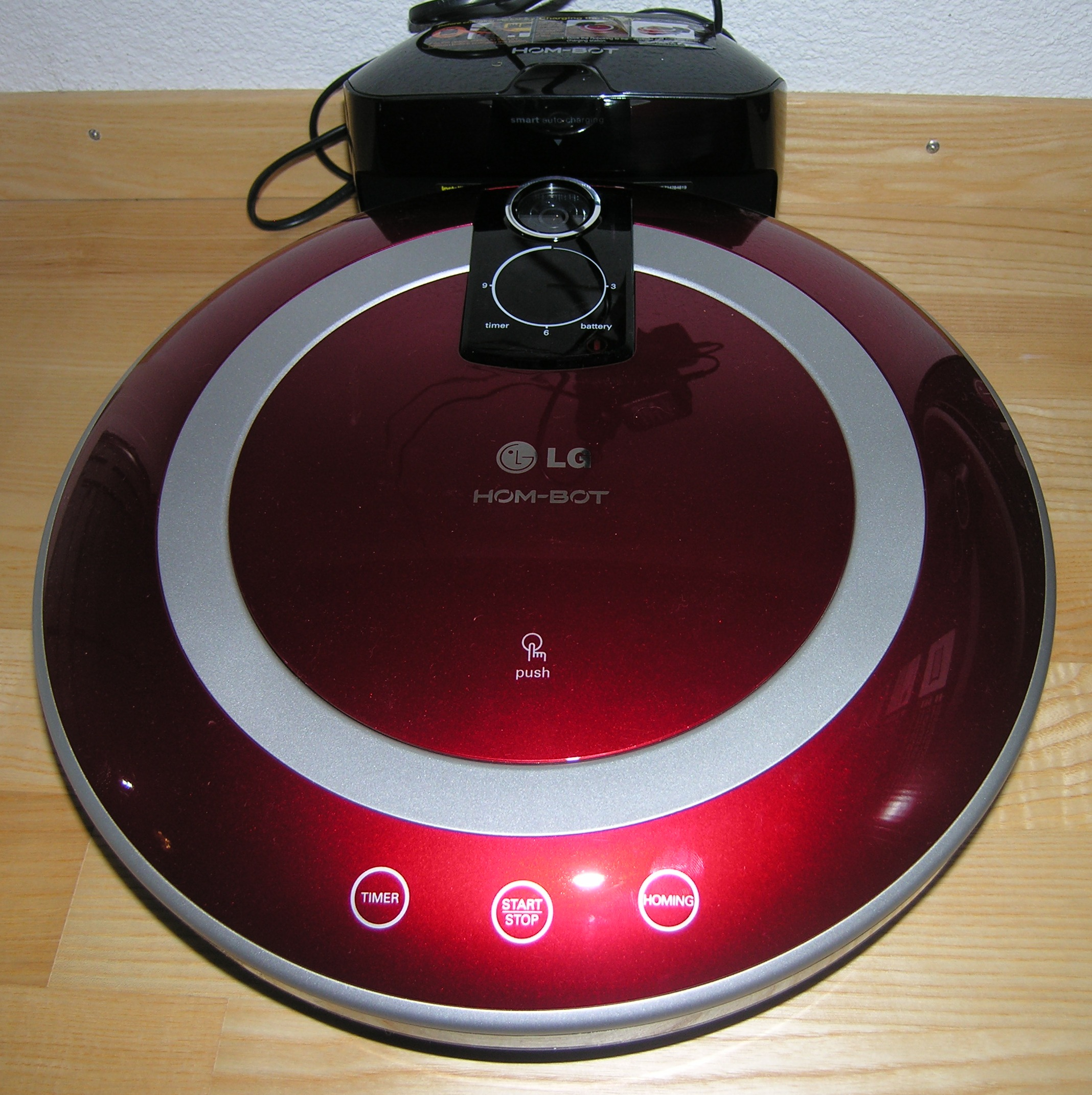
VR5902LVM attached to the charging station

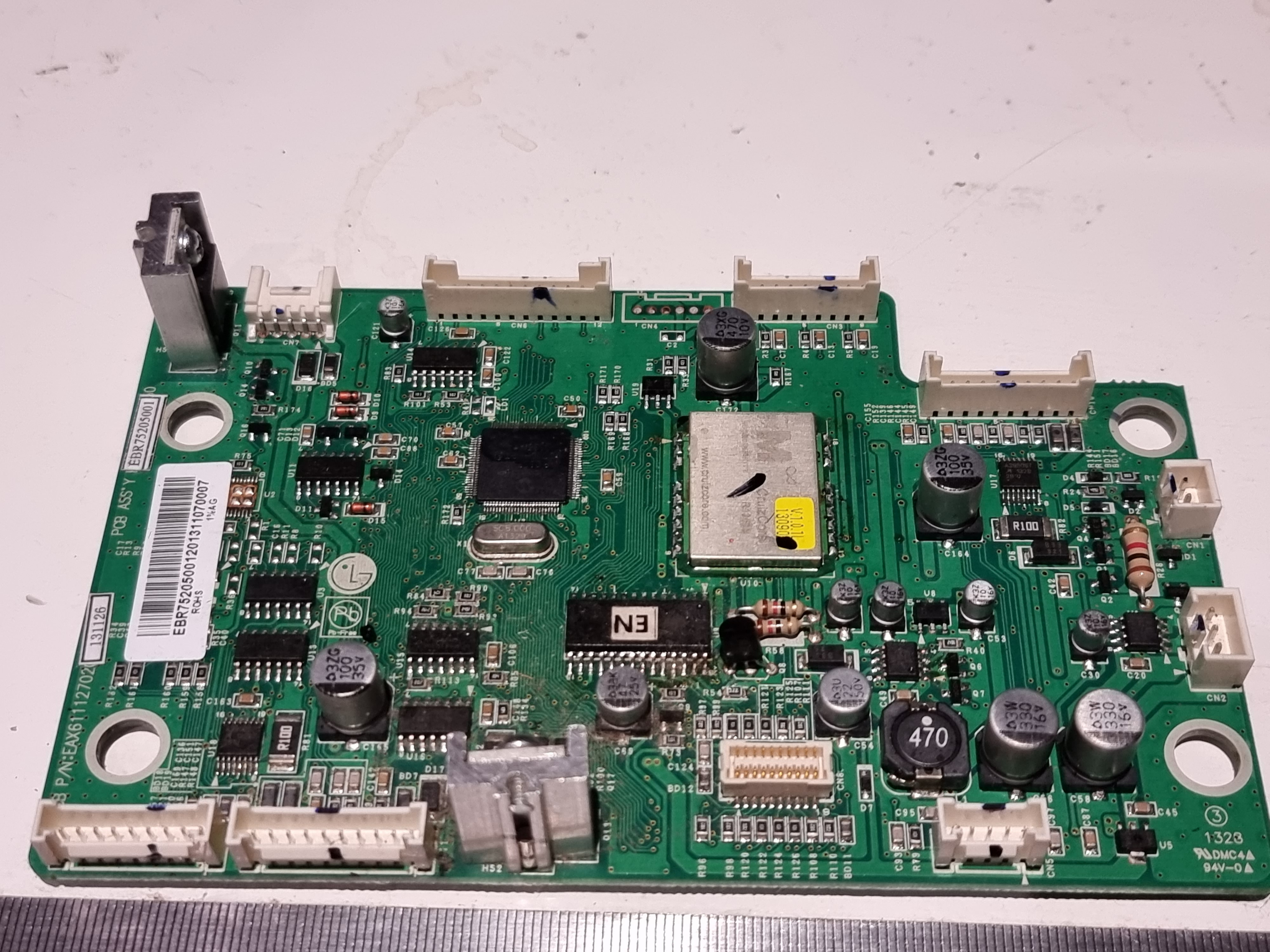
The motherboard

Roboking is a line of automated robotic vacuum cleaners produced by LG. The first version of the Roboking was launched during 2001. The vacuum is also sold under the Hom-Bot moniker outside Korea.

== Operation ==
The Roboking navigates by performing SLAM (simultaneous localization and mapping) to build a map of its environment using ceiling images, while tracking its incremental movement with a downward-facing camera (like an optical mouse). A combination of ultrasound and infrared helps minimize collisions in dynamic environments and optimizes performance by planning the most efficient route. LG claims that these sensors are more effective than the more conventional options of bumpers or light sensors. During homing, the robot goes directly to the remembered location of the charging station rather than looking for it with the help of sensors. Remembered path also helps it to clean multiple rooms.

Like most of other cleaning robots, Roboking is capable of independent docking with its charging station and of scheduled cleaning that starts after the specified number of hours. It cannot be programmed to clean periodically without user interaction and must be serviced after cleanup to empty the dust bin. Remote control provides commands for cleanup, homing, steering and timer setup.

It is reported that the lack of bumper sensors causes the Roboking to push up against obstacles without realizing it, possibly moving them. "This pushing against objects is the single biggest issue with this product.". However 2011 year model has ultrasonic sensors to slow down and turns back if it cannot pass the obstacle. The device is also both advertised and described in reviews as comparatively silent.

== Technical details ==
The 2011 year model contains 22 sensors attached on 32 bit microprocessor. The device runs Linux kernel 2.6 and internally uses Bash, BusyBox, U-boot, glibc and OpenSSL. Source code, where required by the licenses, is available from the address, included in the manual. 1900 mAh Lithium-ion polymer battery is sufficient for 75 minutes of cleaning. The cleaning mechanism is relatively well enclosed and the dust bin is fully closed when removed, resulting cleaner and less maintenance.

The 5906 models use a simpler design, based around a MicroChip dsPIC33FJ256 microcontroller (See photos), although the details of the code are unknown. There is no camera in this model, and it contains the following sensors:

- 5 Ultrasonic sensors to detect walls (designed by Y.M. Kim according to the PCB)
- 3 Optical cliff sensor modules (type unknown).
- 4 Infrared receivers used for both the remote and to locate the docking station.
- A downward-facing optical sensor with 4 visible red LEDs for odometry.
- A MicroInfinity R1350N IMU device for positioning
- A piezoelectric microphone for "dirt detection"

The drive motors also feature a hall-effect sensor, but this is not used in this module, because the pins on the PCB are unused, even though the wiring harness brings the signals from the motor to the main PCB.

== Cleaning modes ==
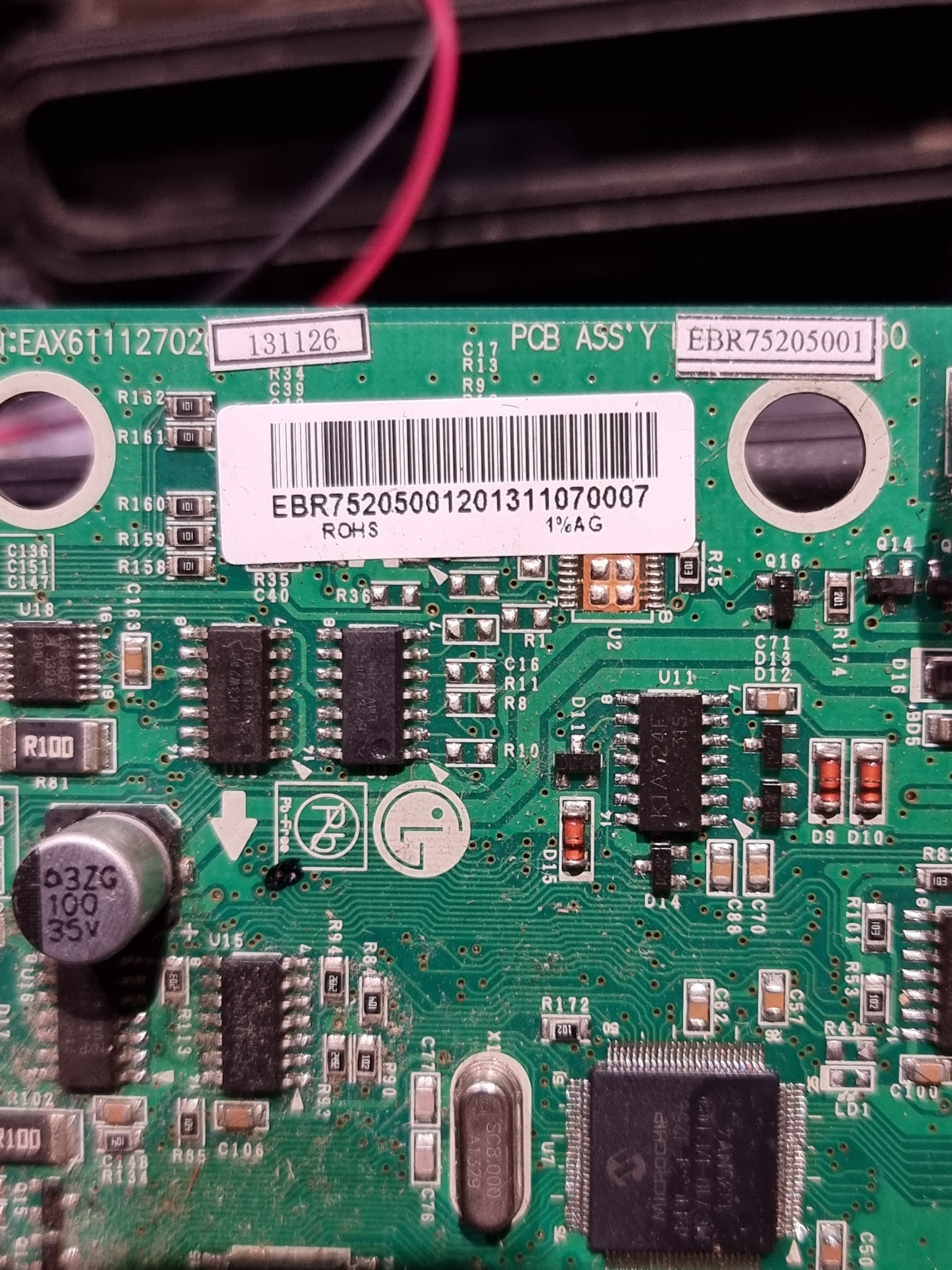
The motherboard back side

The device offers several cleaning modes. During the spot cleaning the robot circles around small, highly contaminated area. During Zig Zag cleaning, it attempts to cover all space in long "wall to wall" sections, resulting in faster but possibly less accurate cleaning. During Cell by Cell (or spatial extension) cleaning it divides the bigger area into cells and cleans each cell separately, only moving to the next cell after the current one is complete. It can also be directly steered with remote control.

== Real time image streaming ==
The 2011 year model VR6180VMNC has the third camera and can stream live images through Wi-Fi. Wi-Fi can also be used to control the cleaner from PC or smartphone. This robot also understands voice commands.

== Models ==
As of 2011, 14 models have been released. These models are grouped in three generations. Further models have since been released.

=== Generation 1 ===
LG VR4000

LG VR4200

LG VR5906KL

LG VR5906LM

=== Generation 2 ===
==== V-Model ====
LG VR5901KL
LG VR5902KL
LG VR5903KL
LG VR5903KLW
LG VR5904KL

==== P-Model ====
LG VR5906KL
LG VR5907KL
LG VR5908KL
LG VR1027R

=== Generation 3 ===
LG VR6170LVM
LG VR6171LVM

=== Generation 4 [2017-] ===
LG VR1227R
LG VR1128SIL
LG VR1126TS
LG VR6260LV
LG VR6260LVM
LG VR6270LVM
LG VR6270LVMB
LG VR6470LVM
LG VR6570LVM

== Additional photos of the circutry from the robots ==
=== Hom-Bot VR6170LVM ===
Link to the additional photos of the circutry
