= Variable refrigerant flow =

Air conditioning system that allows for individual control of spaces

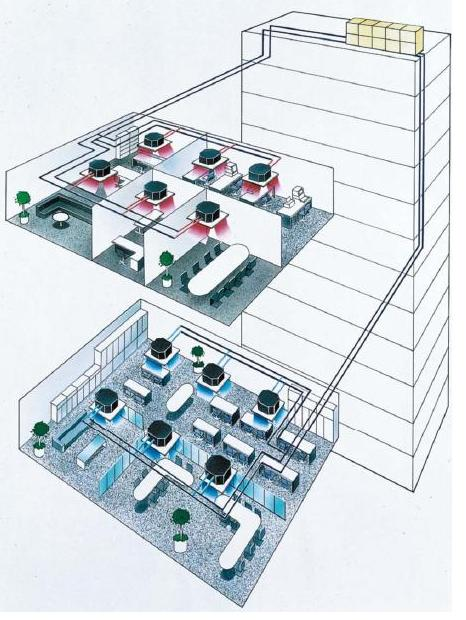
VRF System Concept (Multi Split System air conditioner).

Variable refrigerant flow (VRF), is an HVAC technology invented by Daikin Industries, Ltd. in 1982. Daikin Industries, Ltd. named this "VRV" and holds the registered trademark for it. Similar to ductless mini-split systems, VRFs use refrigerant as the primary cooling and heating medium, and are usually less complex than conventional chiller-based systems. This refrigerant is conditioned by one or more condensing units (which may be outdoors or indoors, water or air cooled), and is circulated within the building to multiple indoor units. VRF systems, unlike conventional chiller-based systems, allow for varying degrees of cooling in more specific areas (because there are no large air handlers, only smaller indoor units), may supply hot water in a heat recovery configuration without affecting efficiency, and switch to heating mode (heat pump) during winter without additional equipment, all of which may allow for reduced energy consumption. Also, air handlers and large ducts are not used which can reduce the height above a dropped ceiling, increase space in the dropped ceiling space, as well as structural impact as VRF uses smaller penetrations for refrigerant pipes instead of ducts. With Liquid VRF, the space otherwise required for air handlers is also significantly reduced.

== Description ==
VRFs are typically installed with an air conditioner inverter which adds a DC inverter to the compressor in order to support variable motor speed and thus variable refrigerant flow rather than simply perform on/off operation. By operating at varying speeds, VRF units work only at the needed rate allowing for substantial energy savings at load conditions. Heat recovery VRF technology allows individual indoor units to heat or cool as required, while the compressor load benefits from the internal heat recovery. Energy savings of up to 55% are predicted over comparable unitary equipment.

This also results in greater control of the building's interior temperature by the building's occupants. The lower start-up power of VRF's DC inverter compressors and their inherent DC power requirements also allow VRF solar-powered heat pumps to be run using DC-providing solar panels.

This may allow for reduced energy consumption. Specifically, VRF systems achieve high efficiency by varying the motor speed of the compressor to match the required load, rather than simply cycling the system on and off. Additionally, the absence of air handlers and large ducts reduces the structural impact on buildings.

VRFs come in two system formats: two-pipe and three-pipe systems. In a heat pump two-pipe system, all of the zones must either be all in cooling or all in heating. Heat Recovery (HR) systems have the ability to simultaneously heat certain zones while cooling others; this is usually done through a three pipe design, with the exception of Mitsubishi, Carrier, and LG, whose systems are able to do this with a two pipe system using a branch circuit (BC) controller to the individual indoor evaporator zones. In this case, the heat extracted from zones requiring cooling is put to use in the zones requiring heating. This is made possible because the heating unit is functioning as a condenser, providing sub-cooled liquid back into the line that is being used for cooling. While the heat recovery system has a greater initial cost, it allows for better zoned thermal control of a building and overall greater efficiencies. In heat recovery VRF systems, some of the indoor units may be in cooling mode while others are in heating mode, reducing energy consumption. If the coefficient of performance in cooling mode of a system is 3, and the coefficient of performance in heating mode is 4, then heat recovery performance can reach more than 7. While it is unlikely that this balance of cooling and heating demand will happen often throughout the year, energy efficiency can be greatly improved when the scenario occurs.

VRF systems may be air or water cooled. If air cooled, VRF condensing units are exposed to outside air and may be outdoors, and condensing units are the size of large refrigerators, since they need to contain a large condenser (heat exchanger) which has a large surface area to transfer heat to the surrounding air, because air doesn't have a high heat capacity and has a low density, volumetric thermal capacity and thermal conductivity thus needing to transfer heat into a large amount of air volume at once. If water cooled, the condensing units are placed indoors and are much smaller and cooled with water by a closed type or circuit cooling tower or dry cooler.

== Japan ==
VRF systems have been used in Japan since the 1980s. By 2007, in Japan, VRFs are used in 50% of midsize office buildings (up to 70,000 ft^{2} or 6,500 m^{2}) and 33% of large commercial buildings (more than 70,000 ft^{2} or 6,500 m^{2}).

== Home automation integration ==
There are dedicated gateways that connect VRFs with home automation and building management systems (BMS) controllers for centralized control and monitoring. In addition, such gateway solutions are capable of providing remote control operation of all HVAC indoor units over the internet.

Newer VRF systems have also incorporated software driven controls. LG's Multi V i, introduced in 2023, included AI based functions for occupancy, humidity, indoor temperature, energy management, auto tuning, remote software upgrades and diagnostic reporting.
