= Voice Mate =

Personal assistant and knowledge navigator software

- Voice Mate on the LG G2
- Developer(s): LG
- Initial release: June 20, 2012; 12 years ago
- Operating system: Android 4.1 and 4.2
- Available in: English and Korean
- Type: Intelligent personal assistant

Voice Mate, formerly called Quick Voice and later Q Voice, is an intelligent personal assistant and knowledge navigator which is only available as a built-in application for various LG smartphones. The application uses a natural language user interface to answer questions, make recommendations, and perform actions by delegating requests to a set of Web services. It is based on the Maluuba personal assistant.

Some of the capabilities of Voice Mate include making appointments, opening apps, setting alarms, updating social network websites, such as Facebook or Twitter and navigation. Voice Mate also offers efficient multitasking as well as automatic activation features, for example when the car engine is started.

== Devices ==
- LG Optimus Vu
- LG Optimus LTE II
- LG Optimus L3
- LG Optimus L5
- LG Optimus L5 II
- LG Optimus L7
- LG Optimus L9
- LG Optimus L9 II
- LG Optimus Vu II
- LG Optimus F3
- LG Optimus F5
- LG Optimus F6
- LG Optimus F7
- LG Optimus G
- LG Optimus G Pro
- LG G2
- LG G Pro 2
- LG G Pad 8.3
- LG Vu 3
- LG G Flex
- LG Volt
- LG G3
- LG G4
