= LG G2 Mini =

Smartphone model

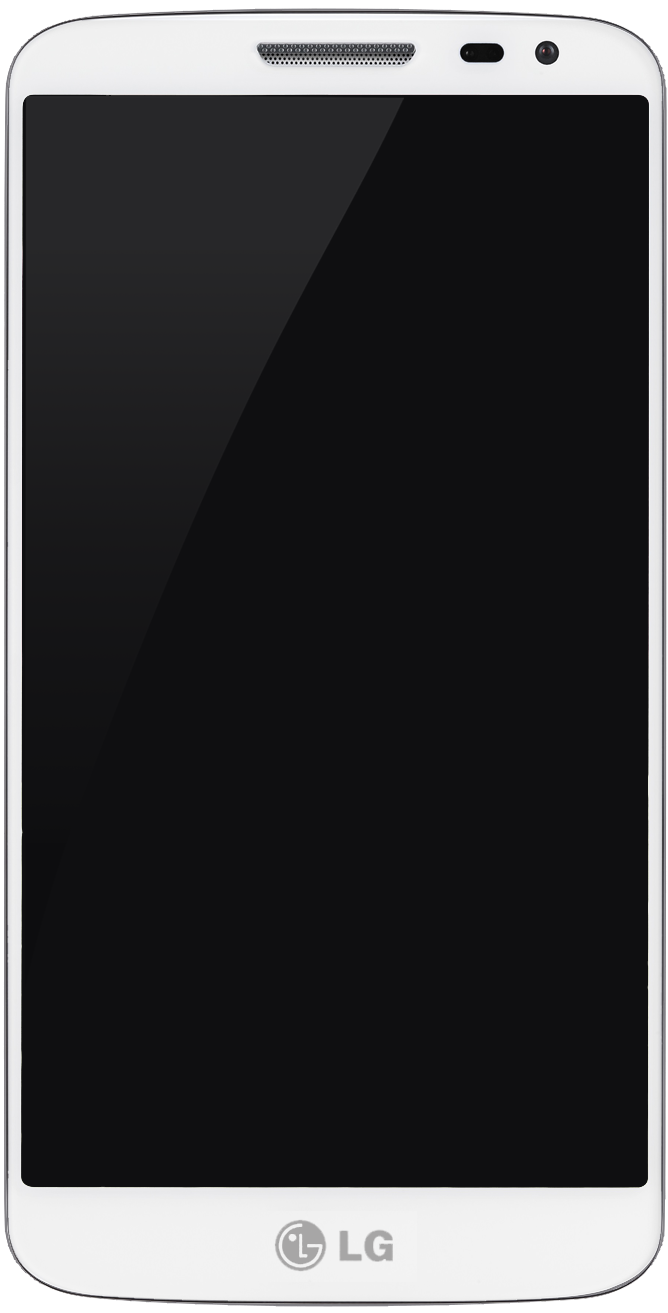
- LG G2 Mini in White
- Brand: G series
- Manufacturer: LG Electronics
- Type: Smartphone
- First released: April 29, 2014; 12 years ago
- Successor: LG G3 Stylus
- Related: LG G2; LG G Pro 2
- Form factor: Slate
- Dimensions: 129.6 mm (5.10 in) H 66 mm (2.6 in) W 9.8 mm (0.39 in) D
- Weight: 121 g (4.3 oz)
- Operating system: Original: Android 4.4.2 "KitKat"; Current: Android 5.0.2 "Lollipop"
- System-on-chip: Qualcomm Snapdragon 400 MSM8226 (Global WCDMA Variant); Qualcomm Snapdragon 400 MSM8926 (Global LTE Variant); Nvidia Tegra 4i SP3X (South American Variant)
- CPU: 1.2 GHz ARM Cortex-A7 (Global Variant); ARM Cortex-A9 R4 MP4 1.7 GHz (South America Variant)
- GPU: Adreno 305 (Global Variant) nVIDIA ULP GeForce 660 MHz (South American Variant)
- Memory: 1 GB RAM
- Storage: 8 GB
- Removable storage: microSD up to 64GB
- Battery: Li-Pol 2,440 mAh
- Rear camera: 8 MP (Global Variant), 13 MP OIS (South American Variant), LED flash
- Front camera: 1.3 MP
- Display: 4.7 in (120 mm) diagonal qHD IPS LCD 960x540 (234 ppi)

LG G2 Mini is an Android smartphone developed by LG Electronics. It was unveiled at a Mobile World Congress on February 23, 2014. The G2 Mini is designed as a smaller version of its full-sized namesake, sharing a similar design but with a smaller display and other lower-end hardware specifications. It lacks a status LED and an ambient light sensor.

== See also ==
- LG G2
- LG Optimus G
- LG Optimus G Pro
- Nexus 5
- List of Android smartphones
