= LG Gx =

Android smartphone developed by LG Electronics

- Manufacturer: LG Electronics
- Type: Smartphone / Phablet
- Series: G series
- First released: December 16, 2013; 12 years ago
- Predecessor: LG Optimus G Pro
- Related: LG G2
- Form factor: Slate
- Dimensions: 150.6 mm (5.93 in) H 76.1 mm (3.00 in) W 9.2 mm (0.36 in) D
- Weight: 167 g (5.9 oz)
- Operating system: Android 4.3 "Jelly Bean"
- System-on-chip: Qualcomm Snapdragon 600 APQ8064T
- CPU: 1.7 GHz quad-core Qualcomm Krait 300
- GPU: Adreno 320 GPU
- Memory: 2 GB RAM
- Storage: 32 GB
- Removable storage: microSDXC up to 64GB
- Battery: Removable Li-Pol 3,140 mAh
- Rear camera: 13 MP, LED flash
- Front camera: 2.1 MP
- Display: 5.5 in (140 mm) diagonal 1080p IPS Plus LCD 1920x1080 (401 ppi) Corning® Gorilla® Glass 2

The LG Gx is an Android smartphone developed by LG Electronics. It serves as an update to LG's phablet, the 2012 LG Optimus G Pro, by updating the software and design to that of LG's new flagship, the 2013 LG G2. Other than that, the smartphone is exactly the same as the LG Optimus G Pro with features that include LTE connectivity and an IR blaster, which allows use as a TV remote control. The handset has only been released in Korea on LG's own network, LG U+, as of 20 February 2014 and LG has not commented on whether it will become an international device.

== See also ==
- List of Android smartphones
