= LG G3 Stylus =

Android smartphone by LG Electronics

LG Stylus
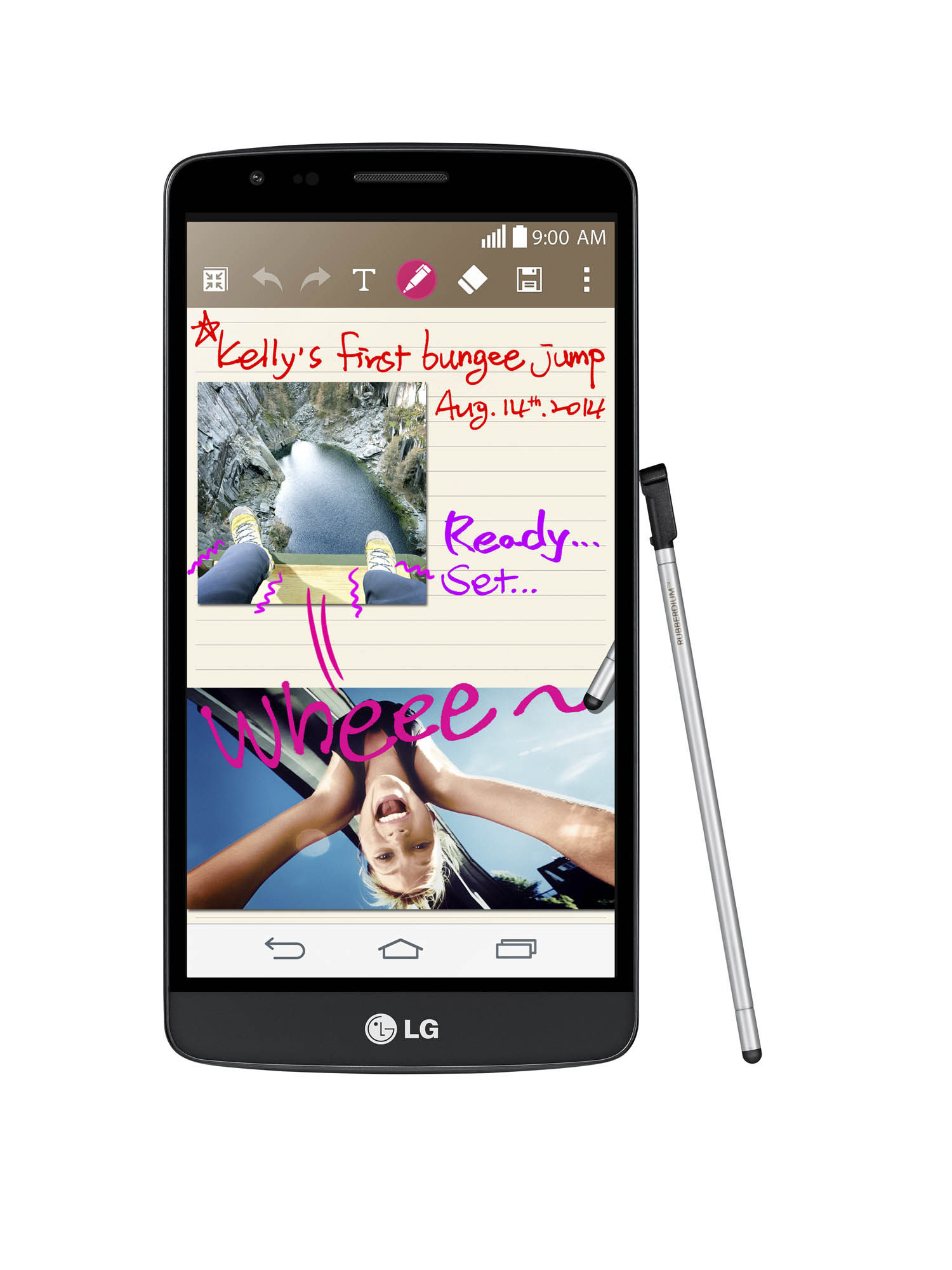
- Brand: G series
- Manufacturer: LG Electronics
- Type: Smartphone
- First released: August 2014
- Predecessor: LG G2 Mini
- Successor: LG G4 Stylus
- Related: LG G3
- Form factor: Phablet
- Dimensions: 149.3 mm (5.88 in) H 75.9 mm (2.99 in) W 10.2 mm (0.40 in) D
- Weight: 163 g (5.7 oz)
- Operating system: Original: Android 4.4.2 "KitKat"; Current: Android 5.0.2 "Lollipop"
- System-on-chip: MediaTek MTK 6582
- CPU: 1.3 GHz Cortex-A7 quad-core
- GPU: Mali-400MP2
- Memory: 1 GB
- Storage: 8 GB
- Removable storage: microSD up to 32 GB
- Battery: 3000 mAh
- Rear camera: 13 MP, LED flash
- Front camera: 1.3MP
- Display: 5.5 in (140 mm) 960×540 qHD (200 ppi) IPS LCD
- Sound: Mono speaker, 3.5 mm stereo audio jack
- SAR: 0.29 W/kg
- Other: Stylus pen, QuickMemo+

LG G3 Stylus is an Android smartphone developed by LG Electronics. It is a low-end phablet modeled after the design of the LG G3, and includes a stylus pen that can be used for drawing and touch input.

== Reception ==
NDTV Gadgets noted that the G3 Stylus, despite its name, was not built to the same specifications of the G3, acknowledging its lower resolution display, a "fairly pedestrian" processor, and for lacking additional design details present on the G3. The stylus was criticized for only being a "passive" accessory with no special support in the device's software for detecting when it is in use or for pressure sensitivity (similarly to the Galaxy Note series), beyond apps that happened to make sense for use with a stylus, such as QuickMemo. The camera was considered "decent though not especially impressive", believing that it was sufficient for casual online sharing. In conclusion, the G3 Stylus was described as being a "nice enough phone", but overpriced in comparison to similar devices with better specifications.

| Preceded by LG G2 Mini | LG G3 Stylus; 2014 | Succeeded by LG G4 Stylus |
