= LG G Flex 2 =

2015 Android phablet by LG Electronics

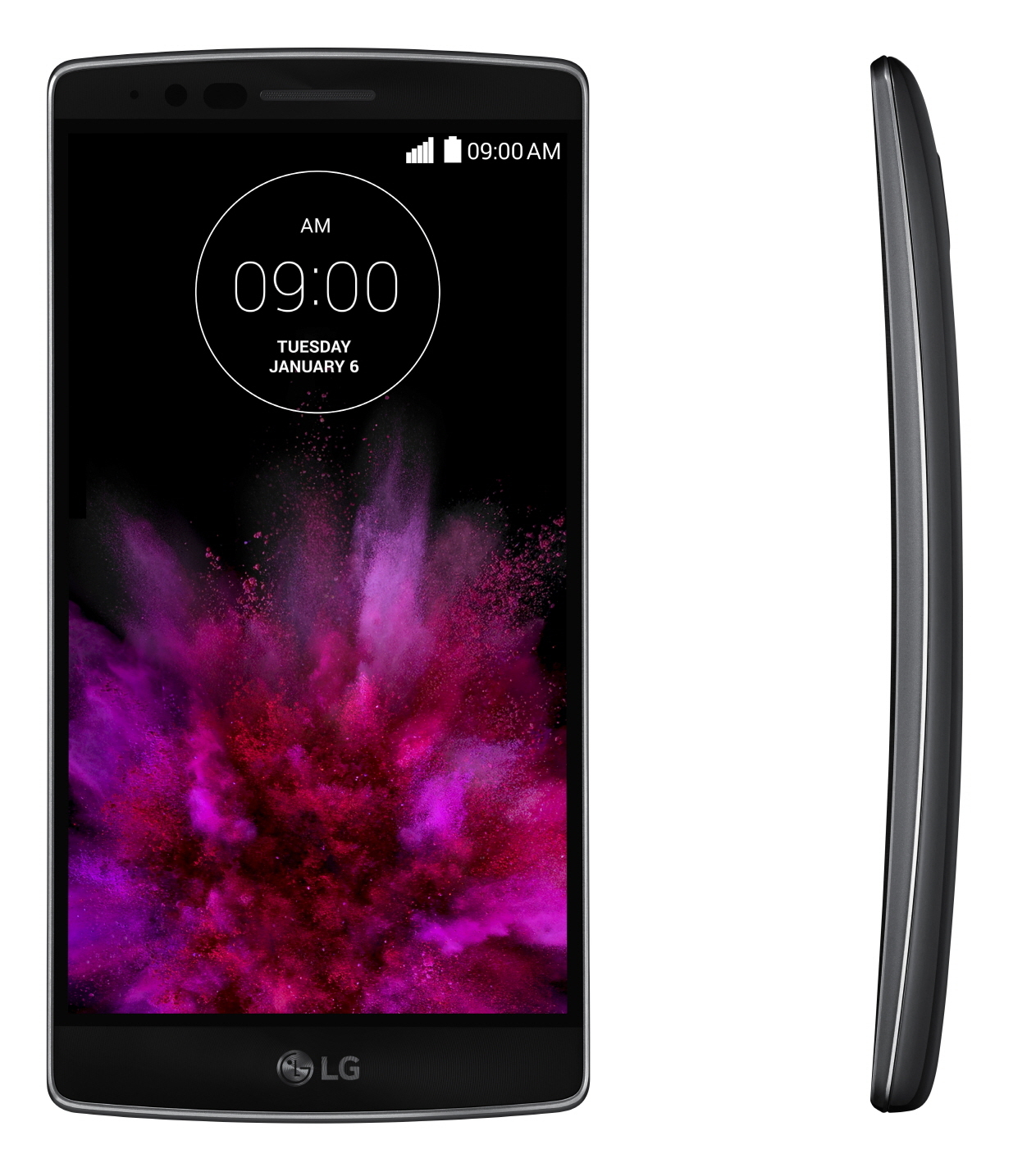
- Manufacturer: LG Electronics
- Type: Smartphone
- Series: G series
- First released: January 6, 2015; 11 years ago
- Predecessor: LG G Flex
- Related: LG G3
- Form factor: Slate
- Dimensions: 149.1 mm (5.87 in) H 75.3 mm (2.96 in) W 7.1 mm (0.28 in) D
- Weight: 152 g (5.4 oz)
- Operating system: Original: Android 5.0.1 "Lollipop"; Current: Android 6.0.1 "Marshmallow"
- System-on-chip: Qualcomm Snapdragon 810
- GPU: Adreno 430
- Memory: 2 GB or 3 GB LPDDR4
- Storage: 16 GB or 32 GB flash memory
- Removable storage: microSDXC up to 128 GB
- Battery: 3,000 mAh
- Rear camera: 13-megapixel, camera with hybrid autofocus, BSI, OIS+, 1080p and 4K video recording
- Front camera: 2.1-megapixel
- Display: 5.5 in (140 mm) Curved P-OLED 403 ppi (1920x1080)
- Connectivity: List: Wi-Fi :802.11 a/b/g/n/ac (2.4/5 GHz); Wi-Fi Direct; Wi-Fi hotspot; DLNA; Miracast; GPS/GLONASS; NFC; Bluetooth 4.1; Infrared; USB 2.0 micro-B port; USB OTG 1.3; MHL 2.0; HDMI (TV-out, via MHL A\V link); 3.5 millimetres (0.14 in) headphone jack
- Other: Accelerometer, gyroscope, Hall-effect sensor, magnetometer, proximity sensor, RGB light sensor

LG G Flex 2 is an Android smartphone developed and manufactured by LG Electronics. It was first unveiled by the company on January 5, 2015, it is a successor to the original LG G Flex released in 2013. The design of the G Flex 2 resembles the LG G3, and as with the original, is differentiated primarily by its curved body and flexible display. LG announced several changes from the original G Flex design, including a smaller, higher-resolution display; reduced body curvature; stronger, chemically-treated screen glass; and a new iteration of the original's "self-healing" back cover that can more quickly repair minor abrasions. It was LG's first device to come with Android Lollipop pre-installed.

It was unveiled on January 5, 2015 at Consumer Electronics Show, and was released in South Korea in late-January 2015.

== History and development ==
The original LG G Flex, released in 2013 as LG's first smartphone with a flexible display and curved chassis, was met with mixed reception, with critics likening the device to a proof of concept rather than a mainstream product. Although the device was praised for its durability and overall performance, the G Flex's display was criticized for having bleeding edge quality, with a 720p panel at only 245 pixels per inch (as opposed to the 1080p screens used by other major high-end phones), a grainy appearance, and noticeable image retention. The G Flex was also panned for its large size, high price, and for lacking functionality specifically meant to take advantage of the device's curved screen.

LG intended the G Flex 2 to address criticisms surrounding the original G Flex: the device was given a more compact design with a softer curve to improve its ergonomics and appearance, and a higher quality 1080p display. Work was done to make the G Flex 2 more shock resistant: its elasticity evenly distributes shocks from impacts across the chassis. LG designer Ramchan Woo demonstrated how the device could withstand certain types of abuse without any major damage, such as being dropped, stepped on, and sat on. To further improve the durability of the device's Gorilla Glass 3 display, the glass also goes through a chemical treatment process developed by LG known as "Dura-Guard". LG claimed that the treatment would improve the screen's durability by around 20%, especially near the edges of the display As with the original G Flex, it will be positioned as a niche product intended for a premium market.

== Specifications ==
The G Flex 2's physical design resembles that of the LG G3, consisting of a curved polycarbonate shell, with volume and power buttons located on the rear of the device directly below the camera. The device is available on-launch in red and silver color schemes. The curvature of the G Flex 2's display remains 700 millimetres (28 in), but the curvature of the rest of the body was reduced to 650 millimetres (26 in) to create a more subtle "bend" in its shape than the original. The G Flex 2's rear cover features a "self-healing" coating which can repair minor scratches and abrasions made to it; the updated version is able to repair itself quicker than the original, taking only around 10 seconds rather than in minutes. As opposed to the 6-inch, 720p display of the original, its flexible OLED display was reduced to 5.5 inches in size, but upgraded to 1080p resolution. The G Flex 2 uses a Qualcomm Snapdragon 810 system-on-chip with 2 or 3 GB of LPDDR4 RAM.

The remainder of its specifications are similar to that of the G3, with either 16 or 32 GB of expandable storage, a 3,000 mAh battery (albeit non-removable), and a 13-megapixel camera with hybrid autofocus. The G Flex 2 runs Android 5.0 "Lollipop" with a custom skin and software similar to the G3. The new "Glance View" feature allows users to view notifications when the display is off by dragging down.
