= LG G Pro Lite =

Smartphone by LG

- Manufacturer: LG Electronics
- Type: Smartphone
- Series: G series
- First released: October 2013; 12 years ago
- Related: LG Optimus G Pro
- Compatible networks: GSM (850 / 900 / 1800 / 1900), HSDPA, LTE
- Form factor: Bar
- Dimensions: 150.2 mm (5.91 in) H 76.9 mm (3.03 in) W 9.4 mm (0.37 in)
- Weight: 161 g (5.68 oz)
- Operating system: Android 4.1.2 "Jelly Bean"
- System-on-chip: MediaTek MT6577
- CPU: 1 GHz dual-core MediaTek MT6577, ARM Cortex-A9
- GPU: PowerVR SGX531
- Memory: 1 GB RAM
- Storage: 8 GB
- Removable storage: microSDXC up to 32GB
- Battery: Li-Ion 3140 mAh
- Rear camera: 8.0 megapixels Back-illuminated sensor, LED flash HD video (1080p) at 30 frames/s Time catch shot, smart shutter and cheese shutter Simultaneous HD video and image recording, Smile and face detection, Image stabilization
- Front camera: 1.3 MP, HD video recording (720p)
- Display: 5.5 in (140 mm) diagonal IPS LCD 540×960 pixels
- Connectivity: 3.5 mm stereo audio jack Wi-Fi 802.11 a/b/g/n, Wi-Fi Hotspot, DLNA; Bluetooth 4.0 + A2DP micro-USB 2.0 (5-pin) port with mobile high-definition video link (MHL) for USB or HDMI connection
- Data inputs: Touch

The LG G Pro Lite is a smartphone designed and manufactured by LG Electronics. It was announced on October 10, 2013.

== Hardware ==
=== Processor ===
The LG G Pro Lite features a MediaTek MT6577 SoC with a Dual-core ARM Cortex-A9 processor clocked at 1.0 GHz. It also featured a PowerVR SGX531 graphics processor running at 200 MHz.

=== Memory ===
The LG G Pro Lite has 1 GB of RAM and 4 GB of internal storage which may be expanded via a microSD card up to 32 GB.

=== Screen ===
The phone features a 5.5" IPS LCD of 540×960 resolution and displaying 16M colors at ~200 PPI pixel density.

=== Cameras ===
The LG G Pro Lite has an 8 MP back-illuminated camera sensor and a single LED flash. The phone is also capable of recording FullHD 1080p video at 30 FPS. The phone also features a front-facing 1.3 MP camera, capable of recording HD 720p video at 30 FPS. The camera supports digital zoom of up to 8X magnification.

=== Battery ===
The LG G Pro Lite is powered by a standard lithium-polymer battery of 3140 mAh.

== Software features and services ==
The LG G Pro Lite runs on Google's Android 4.1.2 Jelly Bean operating system skinned with LG Optimus UI 3.0.

== Critical reception ==
LG G Pro Lite has received a generally favorable reception. CNET reviewed it as a so-so device that is meant for the low end market. PhoneArena reviewed it as an overall great device except for the screen resolution, which seems to be mediocre compared to its competition.

== See also ==
- List of Android smartphones
- Smartphone
- LG G series
