= LG G2 =

Android smartphone developed by LG Electronics

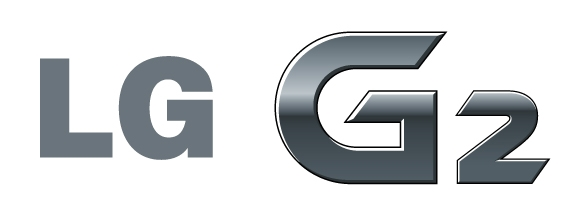

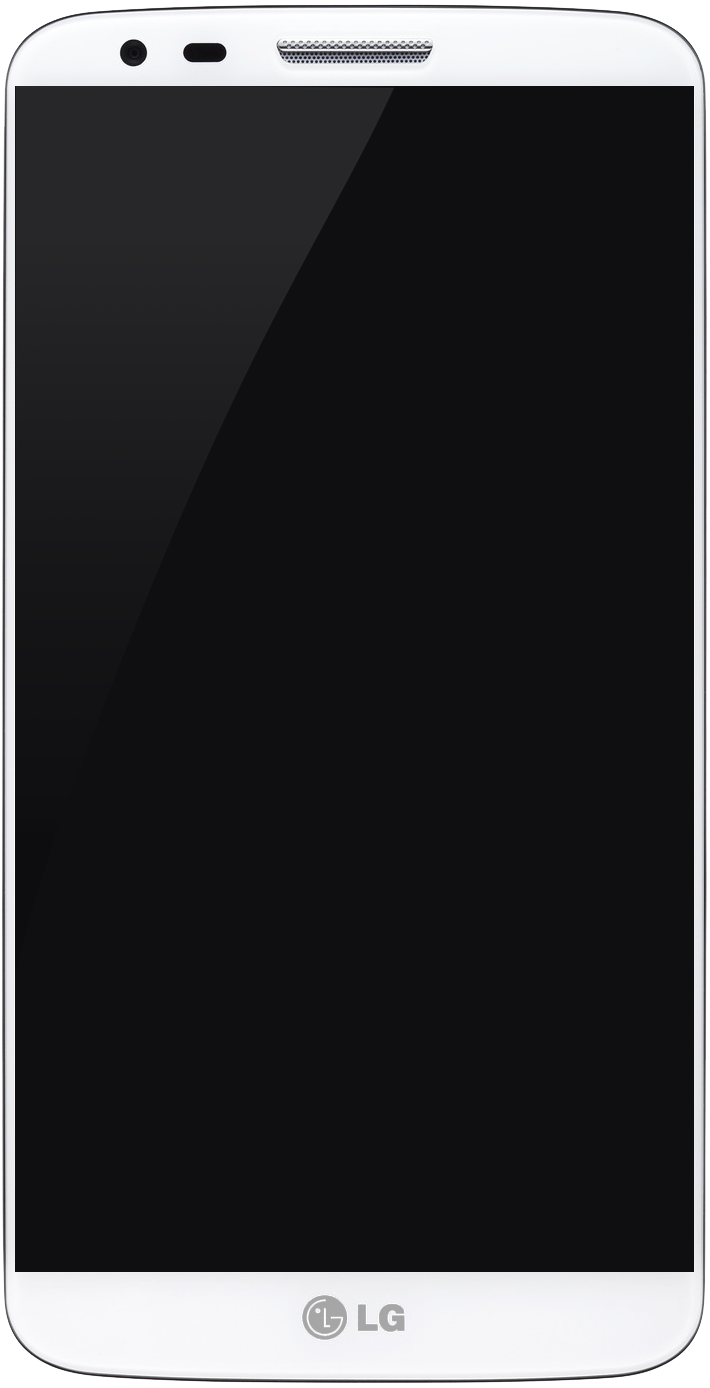
- LG G2 in White
- Brand: G series
- Manufacturer: LG Electronics
- Type: Smartphone
- First released: September 12, 2013; 13 years ago
- Predecessor: LG Optimus G
- Successor: LG G3
- Related: LG G2 Mini; LG G Pro 2 LG G Flex; Nexus 5
- Form factor: Slate
- Dimensions: 138.5 mm (5.45 in) H 70.9 mm (2.79 in) W 8.9 mm (0.35 in) D
- Weight: 143 g (5.0 oz)
- Operating system: Original: Android 4.2.2 "Jelly Bean"; Last: Android 5.0.2 "Lollipop"
- System-on-chip: Qualcomm Snapdragon 800 MSM8974
- CPU: 2.26 GHz Qualcomm quad-core Krait 400
- GPU: Adreno 330
- Memory: 2 GB RAM
- Storage: 16 GB or 32 GB
- Removable storage: microSDXC up to 64GB (South Korean variant only)
- Battery: Non-removable Li-Pol 3,000 mAh; Removable Li-ion 2,610 mAh (South Korean variant)
- Rear camera: Sony IMX135 Exmor RS CMOS 13 MP OIS, F2.4, LED flash
- Front camera: 2.1 MP, F2.6
- Display: 5.2 in (130 mm) diagonal IPS LCD 1920x1080 (424 ppi) with Gorilla Glass 2
- Connectivity: List: Wi-Fi; Wi-Fi Direct; Wi-Fi hotspot; Infrared; DLNA; GPS/GLONASS; NFC; Bluetooth; USB (Micro-B port, USB charging); SlimPort; USB OTG; 3.5 millimetres (0.14 in) headphone jack
- Website: https://web.archive.org/web/20130916212006/http://www.lg.com/us/mobile-phones/g2

The LG G2 is an Android-based smartphone developed by LG Electronics. Serving as a successor to 2012's Optimus G and the 2013 Optimus G Pro phablet, the G2 was unveiled at a press event in New York City on 7 August 2013, and first released in September 2013. The G2 is primarily distinguished by software features that LG billed would "learn" from users, a high fidelity sound system designed to produce higher quality audio, a 5.2 in (130 mm) 1080p IPS LCD screen with technology that the company claimed would improve energy efficiency and reduce the size of the bezel around it, along with the unique placement of its power and volume keys—eschewing their typical location on the edge of a smartphone by placing them on the rear below the camera lens.

The device was released to mostly positive reception; the G2 was universally praised for LG's efforts to produce a more seamless and compact design that nonetheless maximized screen size, its high performance, the quality of its display and primary camera, along with its long-lasting battery. Critics were divided on certain aspects of its design, such as its rear button layout, and its plastic chassis. Which was panned for closely resembling recent Samsung Galaxy products and being a regression from the glass-based chassis of the Optimus G. Similarly, its software and user interface were praised for their usability and large number of customization options, some reviewers felt that the software suffered from feature creep and contained notable usability regressions in comparison to "stock" Android.

Sales of the G2 exceeded LG's estimates; in late December 2013, a Korean news agency reported that at least 3 million units of the G2 had been sold worldwide.

== Release ==
The G2 was first unveiled during a press event at New York City's Jazz at Lincoln Center on 7 August 2013. LG announced that it would begin to release the G2 globally on over 130 carriers within the next two months, in markets such as South Korea and the United States.

To promote the G2, LG attempted to hold a city-wide scavenger hunt in Seoul, South Korea; during a press event at a local park on 9 August 2013, helium balloons (tying in with its "G in the Cloud" advertising campaign) were released that contained 100 vouchers. After the vouchers were scattered through the city by the deflating balloons, LG planned to give away G2s to those who found the vouchers. While only members of the media were formally invited, the event was disrupted by members of the public who learned about the promotion on the internet. As the balloons were released, attendees attempted to use BB guns and other makeshift tools to retrieve them. The resulting quarrel which broke out over the balloons resulted in 20 injuries; following the incident, LG apologized and stated that it would pay for the medical treatment of those injured in the event. LG also called off plans to hold similar events in other South Korean cities.

The G2 was first released in the United States by Verizon on 12 September 2013, and released by AT&T the following day. T-Mobile released the G2 on 25 September, while Sprint released theirs on 8 November 2013. The G2 was released in Canada on 27 September 2013, across six national and regional carriers, including Bell, Rogers, SaskTel, Telus, Vidéotron, and Wind Mobile.

== Specifications ==
=== Hardware ===
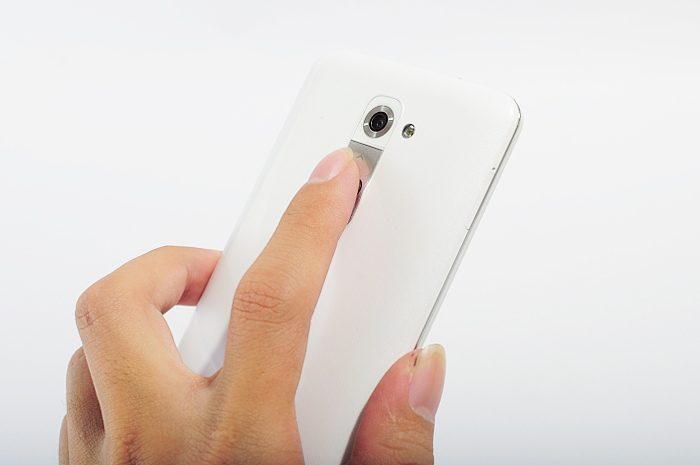
The G2's volume and power keys are positioned on the rear, where the index finger would lie when holding the phone.

The G2's exterior consists of a polycarbonate shell—unlike its predecessor, which used a glass-based construction. The rear cover is adorned with a subtle pattern resembling carbon fiber. The G2's volume and power keys are now located directly below the camera on the rear of the device, whereas before they were located on the sides of the device. The power button contains an LED lamp, which can be used as a notification light. The positioning of the buttons on the rear deviates from the majority of smartphones, where they are located on the bezel (side edge) of the phone. LG argued that buttons located on the bezel were harder to reach on larger smartphones, and made it more likely for users to drop their phone when adjusting the volume during a call. As such, the G2's buttons are instead located where the index finger would normally lie when the phone is held. Alongside the power button, the G2 is also powered on by double-tapping on the screen, and turned off by double-tapping on the status bar or a blank area on the home screen, a feature branded as "KnockOn". When the phone is off, the volume keys can also be used to launch directly into the camera or QuickMemo applications by holding them down.

The G2 is powered by a 2.26 GHz quad-core Snapdragon 800 processor with 2 GB of RAM and support for LTE or LTE Advanced networks where available. The G2 is equipped with a 5.2-inch 1080p IPS display; to reduce the size of its screen bezel, wiring for touchscreen components is routed both above and below the screen itself. To help conserve battery life, the G2 also implements a panel self-refresh system; if the display is showing static content, it is refreshed solely from framebuffer memory (referred to as "graphics RAM"), allowing other display components (such as the GPU) to become idle. LG claimed that this system would allow the screen to use 26% less power than comparable displays on other smartphones.

The G2's audio hardware and software is optimized to support 24-bit/192 kHz audio; during LG's press event, ringtones recorded by the Vienna Boys' Choir (which are also bundled with the device) were used to demonstrate the high quality audio from its internal speaker. The G2 also includes a 13-megapixel primary rear-facing camera with optical image stabilization, and an infrared emitter which allows it to serve as a universal remote with the accompanying QuickRemote app.

The G2 comes with either 16 or 32 GB of non-expandable storage, and includes a non-removable 3000 mAh battery. The Verizon Wireless model of the G2 offers support for Qi wireless charging. Unlike the models released in other countries, South Korean models of the G2 have a removable back cover, a MicroSD card slot for expanded storage, and a removable 2610 mAh battery.

=== Software ===
The G2 ships with Android 4.2.2 "Jelly Bean" with a custom interface and software. It contains a number of features that are designed to "learn" from users by predicting future actions, and allow for flexibility and customization. The G2 retains features from previous LG models such as the Optimus G and G Pro, including QuickMemo (which allows users to write notes on top of a screenshot), QuickRemote (a feature which allows the device to serve as a universal remote), QSlide pop-up apps, and Voice Mate. New features introduced by the G2 include TextLink, which analyzes text messages to detect content such as addresses and times that can be passed to other apps (such as the calendar, a note, or Google Maps), a pop-up menu of relevant apps triggered when plugging in headphones or a USB cable (Plug & Pop), the ability to answer a phone call by holding the phone to the user's head (AnswerMe), Slide Aside, a multitasking feature which allows users to "slide" away apps onto cards with a three-finger gesture, the Clip Tray (which collects content that had been copied to the clipboard), and Guest Mode. The G2 uses on-screen buttons; users can change their background color (which includes black and white options, either solid colored or with a gradient), customize the order of the buttons, or add additional buttons for opening QuickMemo or the notification shade. The G2's default music player supports the playback of WAV and FLAC files with 24-bit/192 kHz audio.

The time catch shot camera feature prevents missing out on moments by capturing photos while idle and keeping up to five in memory.

An update to Android 4.4.2 "KitKat" was released in South Korea in November 2013, and for international models in March 2014. LG touted a "noticeable speed boost" over Jelly Bean, along with battery life improvements, user interface tweaks, and other improvements brought by KitKat. A further update added a new security feature known as "Knock Code" (as introduced by the LG G Pro 2), which allows users to unlock their device by tapping quadrants of the screen in a sequence.

An update to Android 5.0.1 "Lollipop" was first released in South Korea in January 2015. Alongside other internal improvements, it introduces the refreshed "G UI" first introduced by the LG G3, which itself received improvements to match the new visual style and features of Lollipop, The update was also released for the international model and the U.S. carrier versions, but was not released in Canada.

=== Model variants ===
Several different model variants of the G2 are sold, with most variants differing only in support for regional network types and bands. However, the South Korean version features a removable (but smaller) battery and a MicroSD slot, while the U.S. Verizon Wireless version includes Qi wireless charging, but has a noticeably different rear cover design with different designs for the buttons and camera, and replaces the solid black option for the button background with a pink pattern option. In January 2014, in honor of the Chinese New Year, LG released two "limited edition" models of the G2 in selected Asian markets; available in red or gold colors, the limited edition models featured textured casings instead of the glossier plastic used normally by the G2.

Model number	Carrier/Region	2G and 3G band support	LTE band support	Notes
LG-D802	Global	GSM 850/900/1800/1900, UMTS 850/900/1900/2100	800/900/1800/2100/2600	
LG-D803	Canada	GSM 850/900/1800/1900, UMTS 850/1900/2100	700, AWS, 2600	White model was exclusive to Rogers and only sold at Target Mobile, TBooth, Wireless Wave, and Wireless etc. stores. Does not upgrade to Android 5.0 "Lollipop".
LG-D805	Latin America	GSM 850/900/1800/1900, UMTS 850/900/1900/2100	700(17)/1700(4)/2600(7)	
LG-D800	AT&T Mobility (U.S.)	GSM 850/900/1800/1900, UMTS 850/1900/2100	1900(2)/1700(4)/850(5)/700(17)	
LS980	Sprint (U.S.)	GSM 850/900/1800/1900, CDMA 800/850/1900	800 (26) /1900 (25) /2500 (41)	Sprint's G2 was the carrier's first device approved by the Federal Communications Commission (FCC) for use on its tri-band "Spark" LTE service.
LG-D801	T-Mobile US	GSM 850/900/1800/1900, UMTS 850/1700/1900/2100	1900(2)/1700(4)/700(17)	
VS980	Verizon Wireless (U.S.)	GSM 850/900/1800/1900, UMTS 850/900/1900/2100, CDMA 850/1900	1700(4)/700(13)	Supports Qi wireless charging, has a different rear design.
L-01F	NTT DoCoMo (Japan)	GSM 850/900/1800/1900, UMTS 800(6/19)/2100	2100(1)/800(19)/1500(21)	Does not upgrade to Android 4.4 "KitKat".

=== Accessories ===
The QuickWindow case accessory for the G2 was unveiled on 30 July 2013—before the unveiling of the phone itself. The QuickWindow case consists of a plastic shell with a polyurethane flip cover. The cover contains a rounded rectangular window that exposes a portion of the display, allowing a number of functions to be accessed without opening the cover, including notifications, a customizable clock, and a music player.

== Reception ==
=== Pre-release ===
While complimenting its performance and other unique features, The Verge believed that LG was trying too hard to compete with the Samsung Galaxy S4 by closely imitating its design, specifications, and emphasis on features instead of differentiating itself through further innovations. TechRadar also praised its performance and display quality, but considered the design of the G2 itself to be "dull", and believed that while offering many options for advanced users, LG's skinned version of Android 4.2 was too complex for "casual" users (especially noting its notification pull-down, where roughly half the screen is taken up by options).

=== Critical reception ===
The LG G2 was released to a mostly positive reception. In December 2013, the British magazine Stuff named the G2 its 2013 Phone of the Year and Gadget of the Year, reporting that "LG has previously struggled to make an impact on the smartphone market, but the LG G2 is as good as smartphones get in 2013, and shows the established names how it should be done."

The G2 was considered by critics to be well-built, but was criticized for replacing the glass-based construction of the Optimus G with a plainer, plastic-based design, drawing comparisons to recent Samsung products. Ars Technica further criticized the Verizon Wireless version for having a cheaper appearance than the international versions, with a plainer rear cover, modified buttons, and a different speaker layout. The G2's rear buttons were met with equally mixed reception, with most reviewers believing that users would be able to adjust themselves to operate them. Accordingly, the ability to wake the phone by tapping on the screen was considered a more convenient method. The G2 was praised for its high-end hardware, with Engadget describing the device as a "beast" with specifications that "seem familiar to anyone who's read a flagship Android phone review in the last 12 months", recognizing that it had become harder for manufacturers to differentiate their flagship products beyond displays and processors. The G2's display was praised for its high resolution and color accuracy, along with LG's efforts to reduce the screen bezel size. The G2 was also praised for having unexpectedly longer battery life than any of its competitors (along with Motorola's Droid Razr Maxx). After lasting about 20 hours of "standard" use in its testing, the G2's battery was considered by Engadget to be "a sign that we're finally crossing into a world of sensible smartphone batteries."

LG's Android interface design received mixed reviews; TechRadar gave it a positive review, describing it as being "easy enough for novice and expert smartphone users alike", and noting its dynamic elements and customization features. Its increased customization abilities (including different lock screen and home screen animations, and the ability to change the background and layout of the on-screen navigation buttons) were noted by reviewers. The usefulness of the "Slide Aside" feature was questioned due to the availability of other, more efficient means to switch apps. LG's software was generally panned for being unpolished in places, suffering from feature creep, and containing too many unneeded visual effects and skeuomorphic elements (the latter having generally fallen out of favor). The G2's software was also panned for containing usability digressions in comparison to stock Android, such as the notification tray being taken up by options, not using Android 4.2's updated "Complete action using" menu and behavior, and, despite using on-screen buttons, continued use of the "Menu" key which was officially deprecated by Google in its Android human interface guidelines for Android 4.x (on apps which comply with the HIG, overflow menus are intended to be displayed within the apps themselves. The device's Menu key is replaced by a "Recent apps" key, and a small "Menu" key appears to the side when needed). The Nexus 5 was released by LG shortly afterwards and shares much of the G2's hardware albeit with a lower-quality rear camera and smaller battery to hit a lower price point; the Nexus 5 has been touted as a clean Android software alternative with the added advantage of running the latest Android 4.4 "KitKat" while the G2 had to make do with a bloatware-filled Android 4.2.2 "Jelly Bean" for a time.

The G2's rear-facing camera was considered good for its class, with its processor contributing to quicker HDR photo processing than its competitors. The Verge remarked that despite LG having "practically stolen" Samsung's camera design and modes, the G2's camera interface was among the better implementations of Android camera software due to its available options. However, its low-light photos and some of its other modes were panned for not being as good as those of other devices such as the Nokia Lumia 920 and HTC One. In a photography-focused review by Digital Photography Review, the optical image stabilization system was praised for helping maintain good levels of exposure, and well-lit photos were found to have a decent level of detail, noting that its lens was "sharp pretty much all across the frame and free of chromatic aberrations." However, it was noted that "as the light gets dimmer and in [sic] the ISO starts to increase", the device began to suffer from "very heavy-handed noise reduction which results in visible softness", and further noted that "[its] detail starts to suffer as soon as you go higher than base ISO and by ISO 400 most low-contrast detail is gone." However, in a December 2013 comparison against other recent phones such as the One, Galaxy S4 Zoom, Xperia Z1, iPhone 5S, and Lumia 1020 by TechRadar, the G2 was named the best cameraphone of the six for "[performing] very well in terms of picture quality, ease of use and functionality, as well as post processing", although it was panned for not having as many options as its competitors, and for the probability of fingers accidentally getting into landscape shots due to the positioning of the lens.

=== Sales ===
In December 2013, Asia Today reported that 2.3 million units of the G2 had been sold since its release in September 2013, with at least 600,000 sold in South Korea alone. These numbers were below LG's original estimates of 3 million units. However, later in the month, news agency Yonhap reported more positive numbers from analysts, with at least 3 million units sold and 900,000 sold in South Korea.

== See also ==
Preceded by LG Optimus G	LG G2; 2013	Succeeded by LG G3
