= LG G Flex =

Android phablet

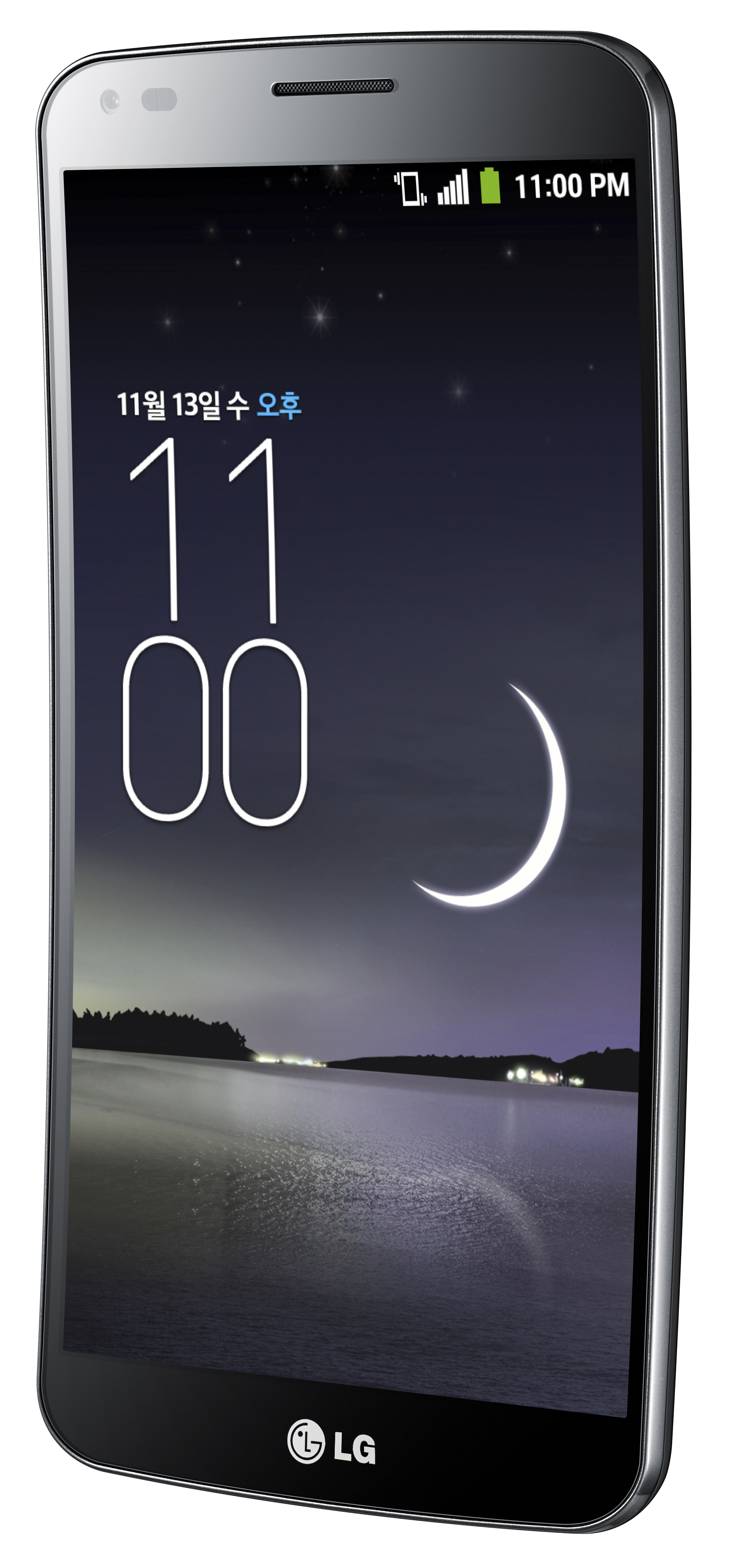
- Manufacturer: LG Electronics
- Type: Phablet
- Series: G series
- First released: November 12, 2013
- Successor: LG G Flex 2
- Related: LG G2; LG G Pro 2 LG Vu 3
- Form factor: Slate
- Dimensions: 160.5 mm (6.32 in) H 81.6 mm (3.21 in) W 7.9 mm (0.31 in) D
- Weight: 177 g (6.2 oz)
- Operating system: Original: Android 4.2.2 "Jelly Bean"; Current: Android 4.4.2 "KitKat"
- System-on-chip: Qualcomm Snapdragon 800
- CPU: 2.26 GHz quad-core Krait 400
- GPU: Adreno 330
- Memory: 2 GB LPDDR3
- Storage: 32 GB flash memory
- Battery: 3,500 mAh
- Rear camera: 13-megapixel, camera with autofocus, BSI, 1080p and 4K video recording
- Front camera: 2.1-megapixel
- Display: 6 in (150 mm) Curved P-OLED 245 ppi (720×1280)
- Connectivity: List: Wi-Fi :802.11 a/b/g/n/ac (2.4/5 GHz); Wi-Fi Direct; Wi-Fi hotspot; DLNA; Miracast; GPS/GLONASS; NFC; Bluetooth 4.0; Infrared; USB 3.0 micro-B port; USB OTG 1.3; MHL 2.0; HDMI (TV-out, via MHL A\V link); 3.5 millimetres (0.14 in) headphone jack
- Other: Accelerometer, barometer, gesture sensor, gyroscope, Hall-effect sensor, hygrometer, magnetometer, proximity sensor, RGB light sensor, thermometer

The LG G Flex is an Android phablet smartphone developed and manufactured by LG. First unveiled by the company on October 27, 2013 for a release in South Korea, and carrying similarities to its G2 model, the smartphone is the company's first to incorporate a flexible display, along with a "self-healing" rear cover which can repair minor abrasions on its own.

The G Flex was met with mixed reviews by critics, who characterized the device as a proof of concept for bleeding edge flexible screen technology rather than a device targeted towards the mass market. While the G Flex was praised for its durability, performance and the visibility of its screen, it was panned for being too similar in hardware, software, and design to the G2, having a low-resolution display that suffered from noise and image retention issues, and for presenting no compelling justification for the curved display in relation to the device's high price.

It was succeeded by the LG G Flex 2 in January 2015.

== History ==
In May 2013, LG announced that it would unveil prototypes for two OLED flexible displays at an exhibition organized by the Society for Information Display; a 55-inch television, and a 5-inch "unbreakable" display meant for mobile devices. In October 2013, rumors from a "person familiar with the company's launch plans" suggested that LG was planning to release a phablet with a curved, 6-inch OLED display known as the "G Flex".

On October 27, 2013, LG officially unveiled the G Flex for a release in South Korea in November 2013, and later announced releases in Europe and the rest of Asia. Although LG had yet to confirm a North American release, a variant supporting United States carriers' networks was approved by the Federal Communications Commission in November 2013. At Consumer Electronics Show in January 2014, LG announced a U.S. release for the G Flex across several major carriers.

In March 2014, LG released an advertisement online to promote the G Flex, which portrayed the device as being "the most human phone ever" by representing a caller as a talking, bearded mouth on the user's hand, complete with an ear on the finger as an earpiece. The user is also seen feeding the mouth cake, and when phoning a woman later in the ad, kissing it. The ad was met with attention from media outlets, who considered it to be bizarre, with a TechCrunch writer going as far as dubbing it the worst commercial for a smartphone ever, and Kate Hutchington of The Guardian declaring it "more disturbing than the act of taking your mum to see Nymphomaniac on Mother's Day."

== Specifications ==
The G Flex's physical design resembles that of the LG G2, consisting of a polycarbonate shell with a curvature of 700 millimetres (28 in), with volume and power buttons located on the rear of the device directly below the camera—the power button also contains an LED lamp which can be used as a notification light. The rear casing of the G Flex carries a "brushed metal" look and features a "self-healing" coating which can repair minor scratches and abrasions made to it. LG claimed that the curved design would be more "natural" when held to the head for conducting phone calls, and would reduce the level of glare on the display. While the phone can withstand being bent—having been being bent a hundred times with 88 pounds (40 kg) of pressure during internal testing without any permanent damage to its form, LG chose to maintain a level of rigidity to the G Flex's design in order to ensure a "premium" feel. The G Flex's internal hardware is almost identical to the G2, with a 2.26 GHz quad-core Snapdragon 800 processor with 2 GB of RAM, support for LTE or LTE Advanced networks where available, 32 GB of internal storage, and an infrared emitter. Unlike the G2, however, the G Flex's display is a 6-inch (15 cm), 720p, flexible OLED display coated with Gorilla Glass, and it also incorporates a non-removable 3500 mAh battery specifically optimized for the G Flex's curved form factor - it curves around the frame to fill any empty space; LG claims it's the world’s first curved battery.

The ability to film in 4K (2160p) resolution was added through a subsequent software update.

=== Software ===
The G Flex ships with Android 4.2.2 "Jelly Bean" with a similar user interface and software to the G2. Several minor new features were added, including a "dual-window" split-screen multitasking mode, and alongside the G2's existing optimization options for one-handed use, the ability to slide all of the on-screen navigation keys to one side of the screen. Aside from the lack of optical image stabilization (which was excluded because it would make the image sensor too tall for the device's body), the G Flex's 13-megapixel camera is similar to the G2, with the addition of a new "Face Tracking" shooting mode to assist users in taking photos containing themselves with the rear-facing camera, which automatically focuses on the user's face, and uses the power button's notification LED as a status light.

In March 2014, LG began rolling out an update to Android 4.4.2 "KitKat". Along with other improvements, the update adds "Knock Code", a security feature introduced by the LG G Pro 2 which allows users to unlock their device by tapping certain quadrants of the screen in a sequence.

The LG G Flex will not officially be updated to Android 5.0 "Lollipop".

== Reception ==
The G Flex was released to mixed reviews. The design of the G Flex was praised for its durability and bendability, with Engadget reporting that they "did plenty of pushing and pulling on the device to test its physical limits, and none of our efforts resulted in cracking or any kind of damage to the chassis." However, The Verge felt that the "self-healing" rear cover was not effective enough after it was unable to recover from a scratch from a key, comparing it to Wolverine only being able to heal from paper cuts. The design of the phone itself was panned for being lackluster, and for being too similar to the G2. Although it was praised for its performance and battery life, the G Flex's hardware and software were also panned for being too similar to the G2, with its software in particular being criticized for not containing any features specifically intended to take advantage of the curved screen (besides the lock screen wallpaper tilting along with the phone), and for the removal of optical image stabilization from the camera.

The G Flex's curved display was praised for having good viewing angles and brightness levels, and as promised, having a lower level of glare than most smartphones. However, the display was criticized for having a significantly lower resolution than other flagship phones and a grainy appearance, while Ars Technica also noticed issues with image retention and uneven lighting on screen contents. LG's decision to introduce its flexible display on an abnormally large phone was also noted; in response to LG billing the display as having a more "immersive" viewing experience for movies, The Verge felt that "it's [immersive] due to the sheer size of the display. And I don't care what it's made of: a 6-inch smartphone is never going to feel comfortable on my face while I make a phone call.".

Engadget ultimately gave the G Flex an 83 out of 100, noting that the device was "a cross between a status symbol and a proof of concept [in some respects]", but contending that the device was too expensive (costing about US$940 upfront) and recommended that consumers wait for options with more "reasonable" prices before considering to buy a curved smartphone. The Verge gave the G Flex a 7 out of 10, arguing that given its high price, there was nothing "compelling" about the curved screen as used by the G Flex, and that it "[felt] like a tech demo, an R&D prototype that was accidentally swapped in a shipping crate with the G2. LG just decided to roll with it, put the G Flex on sale, and see what happens."
