= LG G series =

Smartphone series by LG Electronics

- Developer: LG Electronics
- Type: Smartphones, smartwatches, and tablets

The LG G series was a line of Android devices produced by LG Electronics. The "G" designation was introduced in 2012 as a branch of the LG Optimus series for flagship devices, but LG announced in July 2013 that the "Optimus" name would be discontinued for future flagships in favor of maintaining "G" and "Vu" as distinct brands. The first purely G-branded phone, the LG G2, was unveiled in August 2013.

LG's first two smartwatches, the LG G Watch and the LG G Watch R, were also part of the LG G series. Starting with the LG Watch Urbane, LG dropped the "G" branding from the device's name, thus eliminating the watches from the G series.

In April 2020, LG announced that it would discontinue the G branding and return to using distinct brand names for future flagship devices (beginning with the LG Velvet), to "resonate with today's consumers and help us to establish a clearer brand identity."

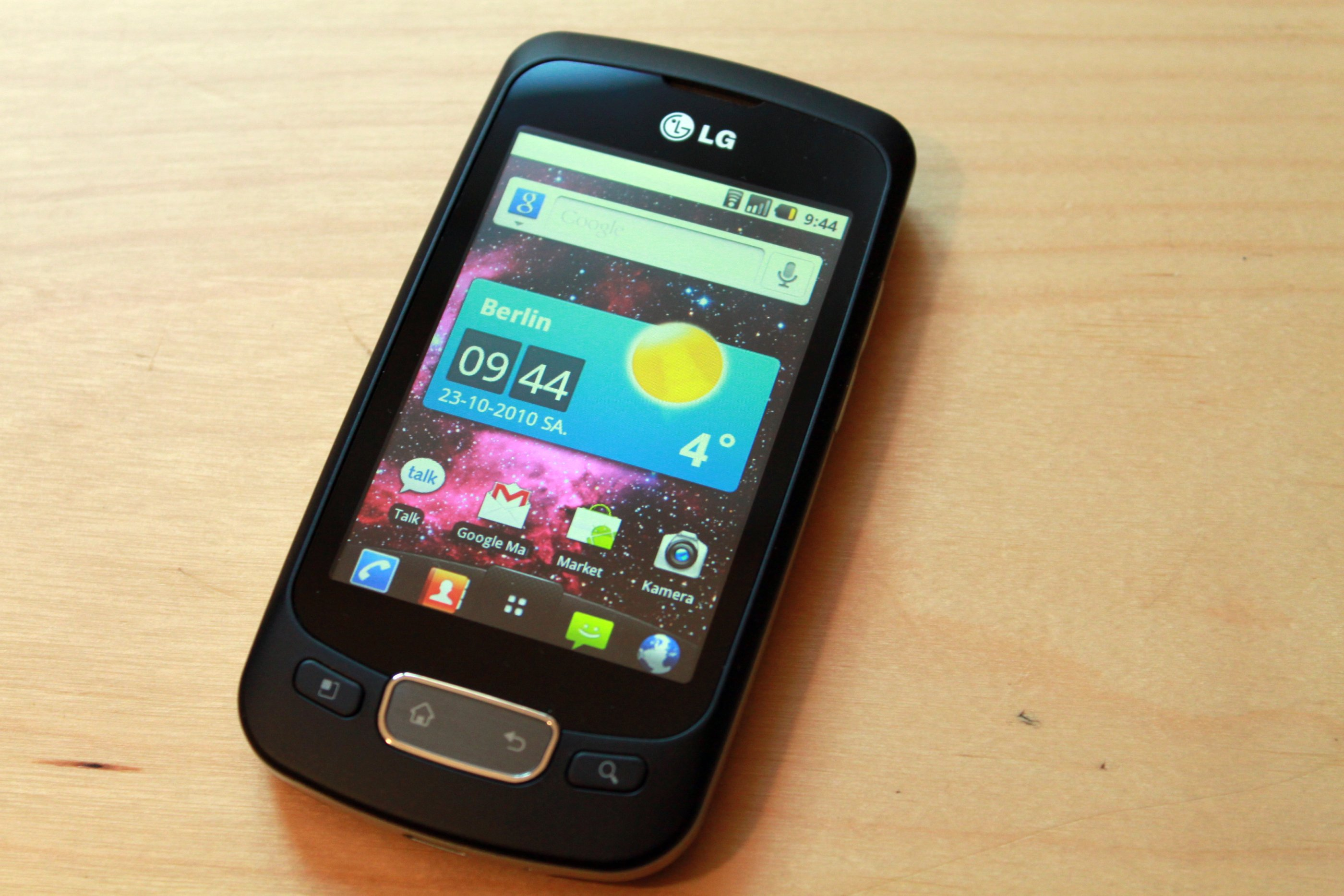
LG Optimus One

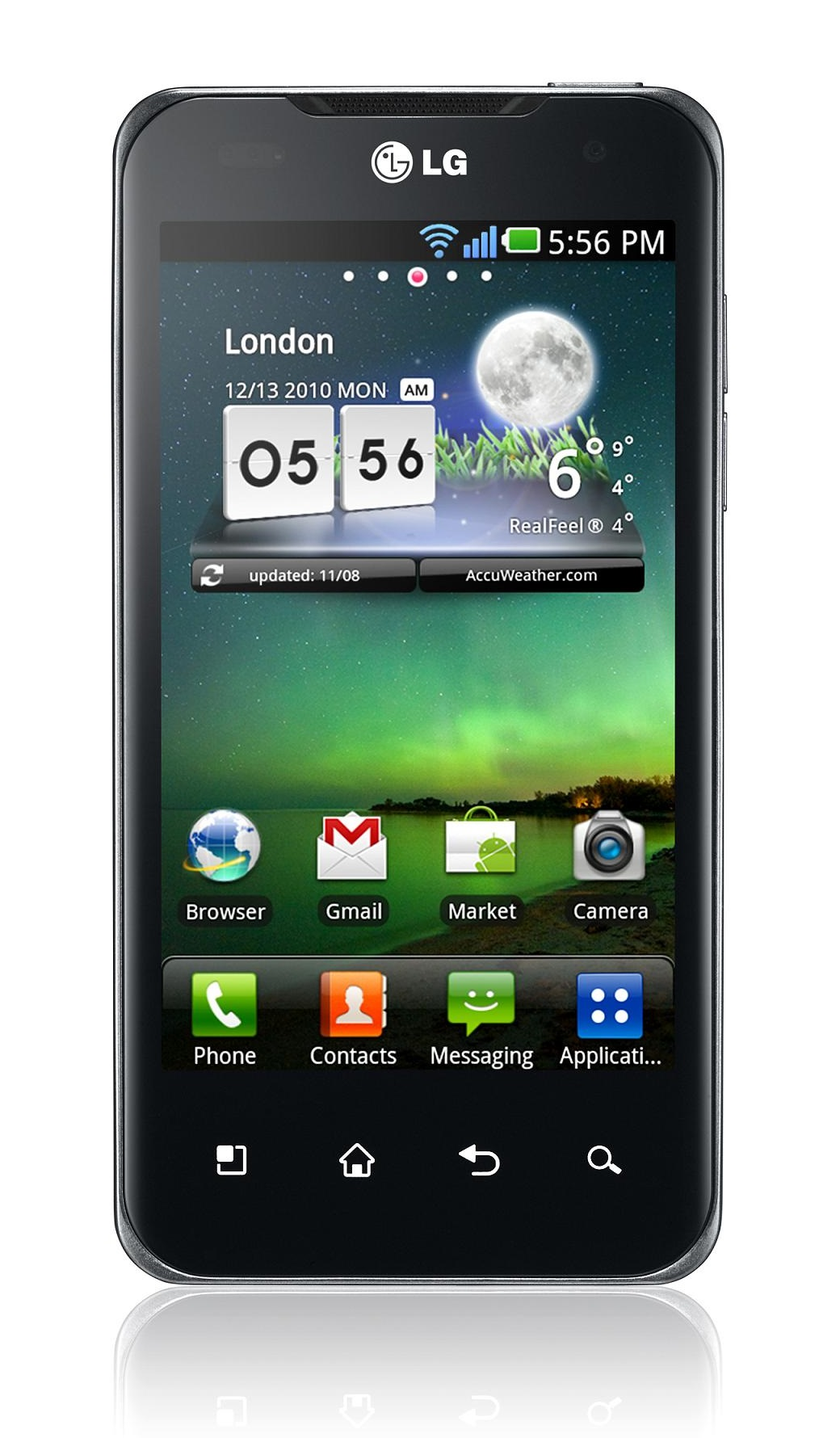
LG Optimus 2x

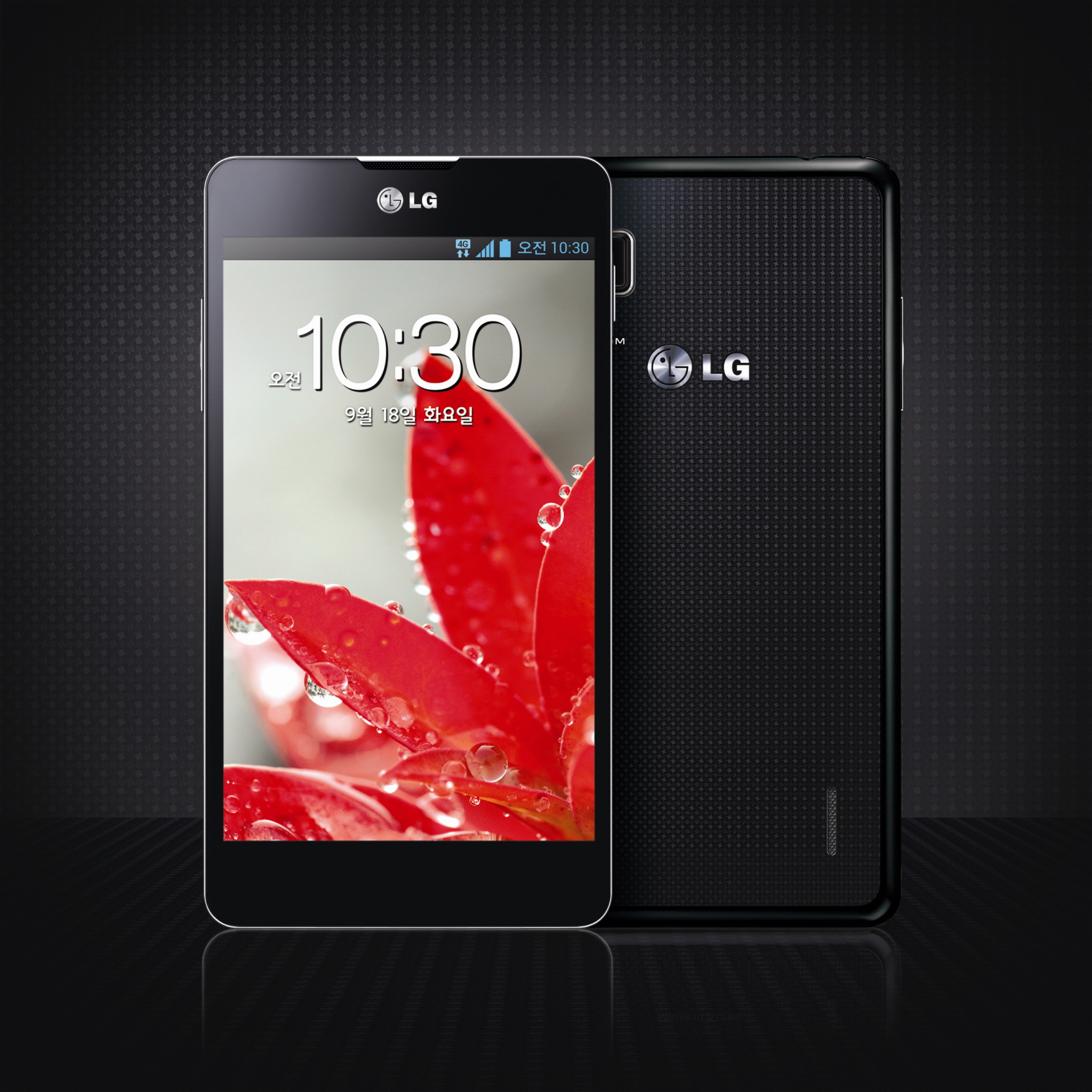
LG Optimus G

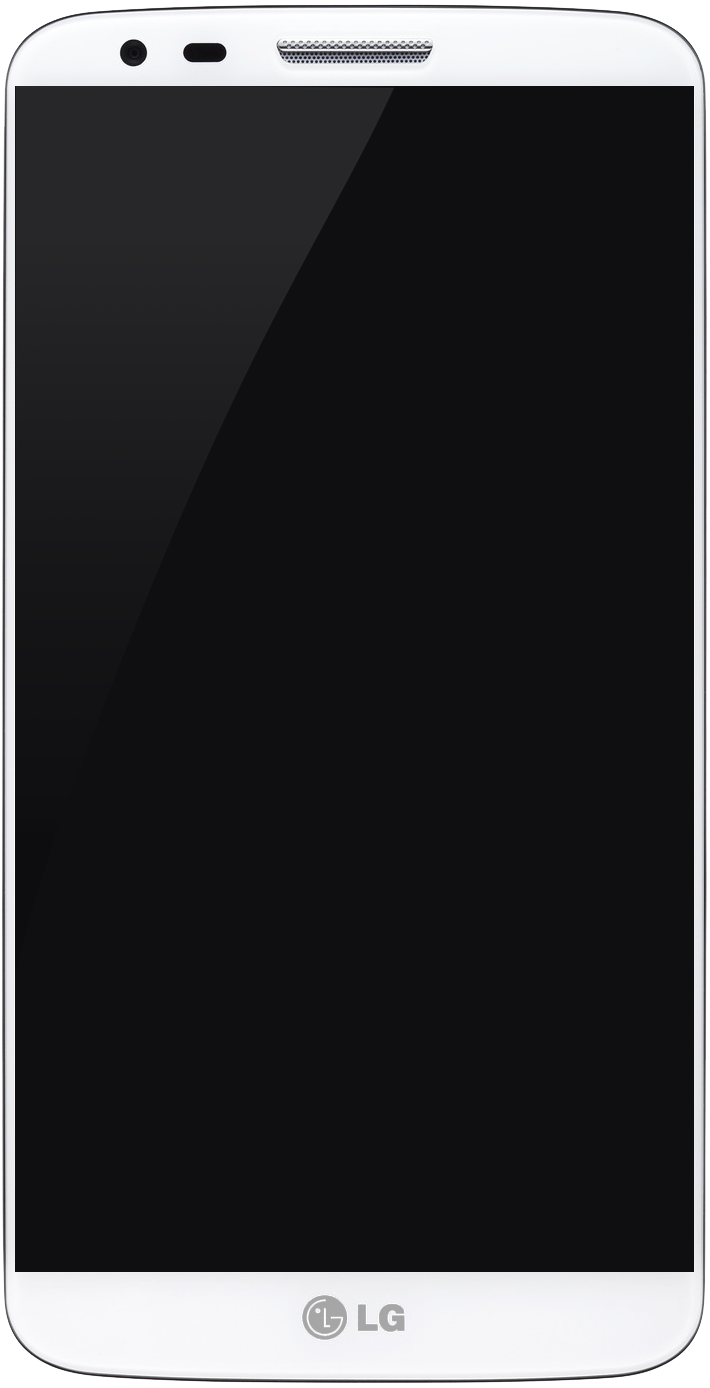
LG G2

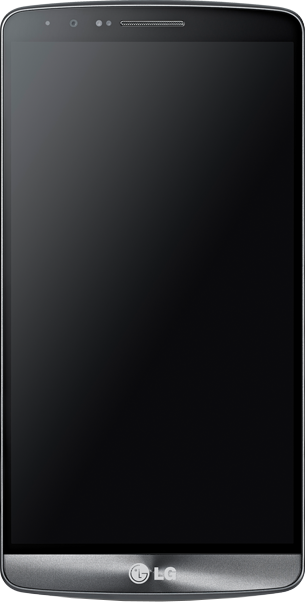
LG G3

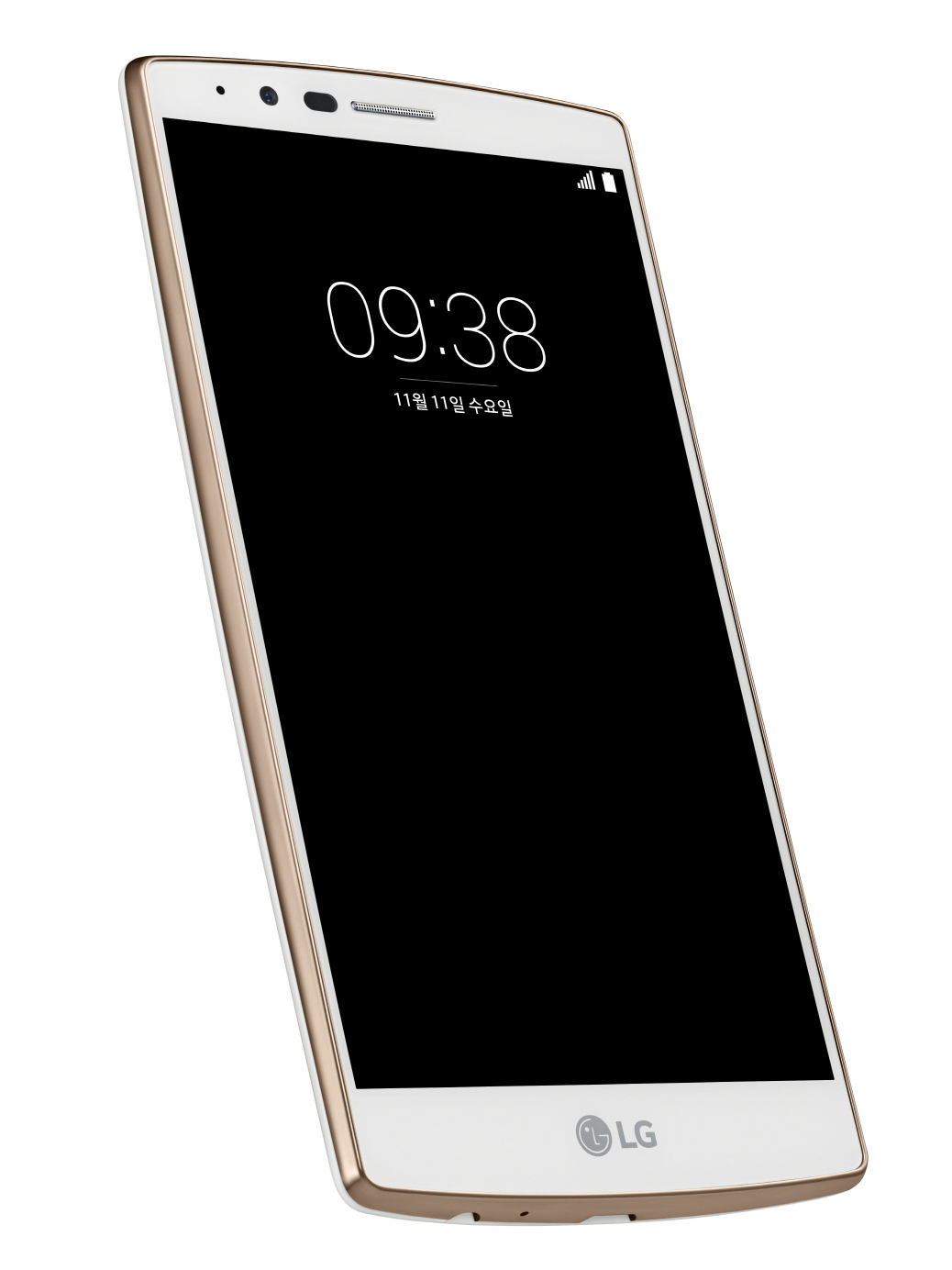
LG G4

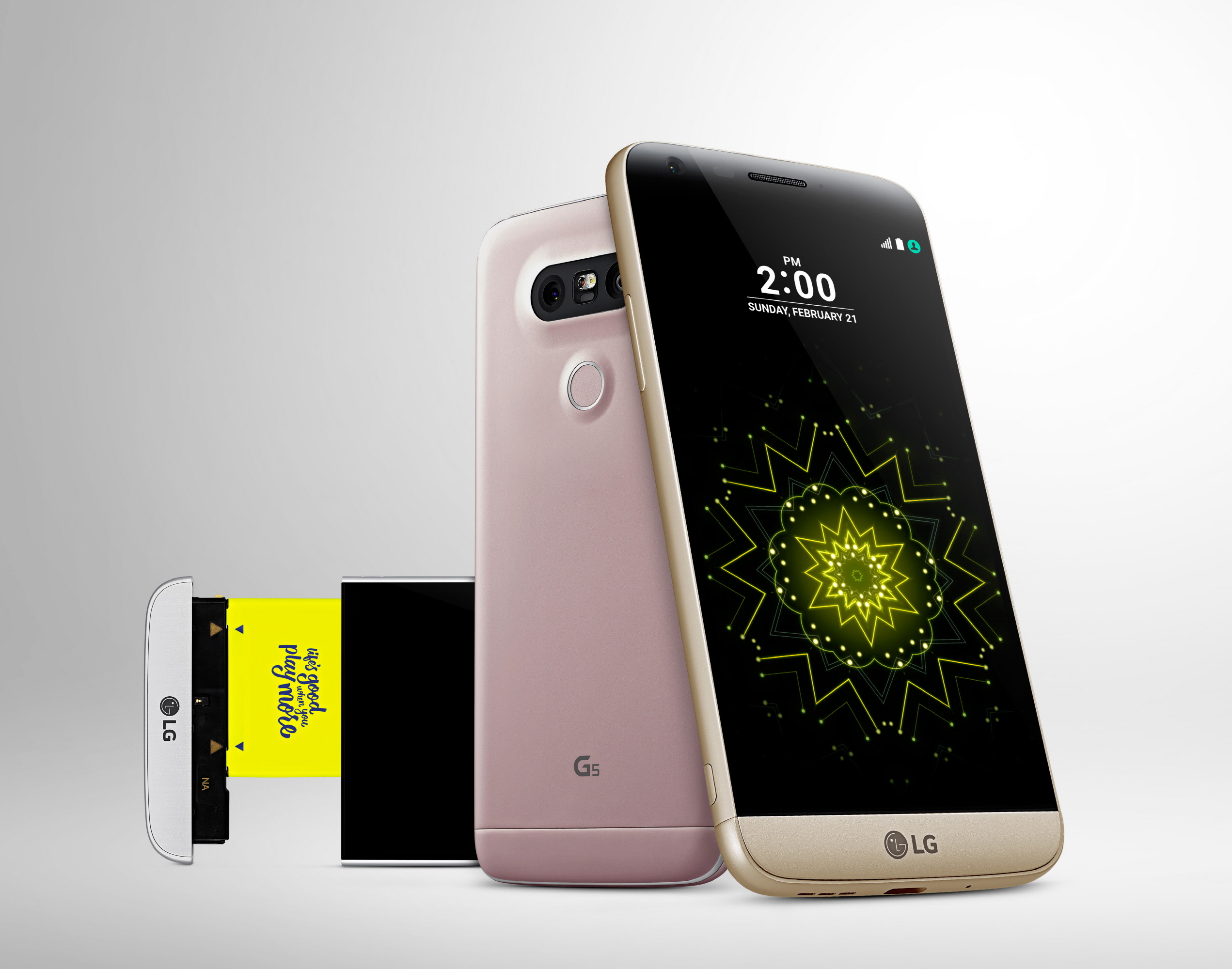
LG G5

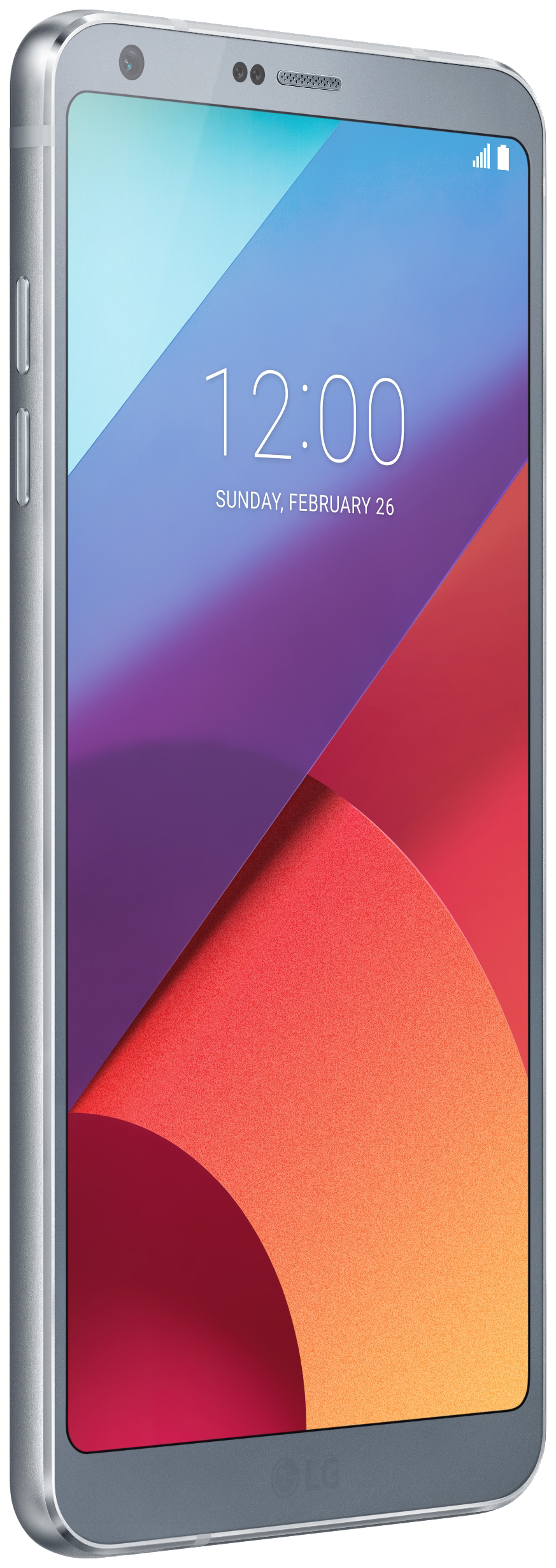
LG G6

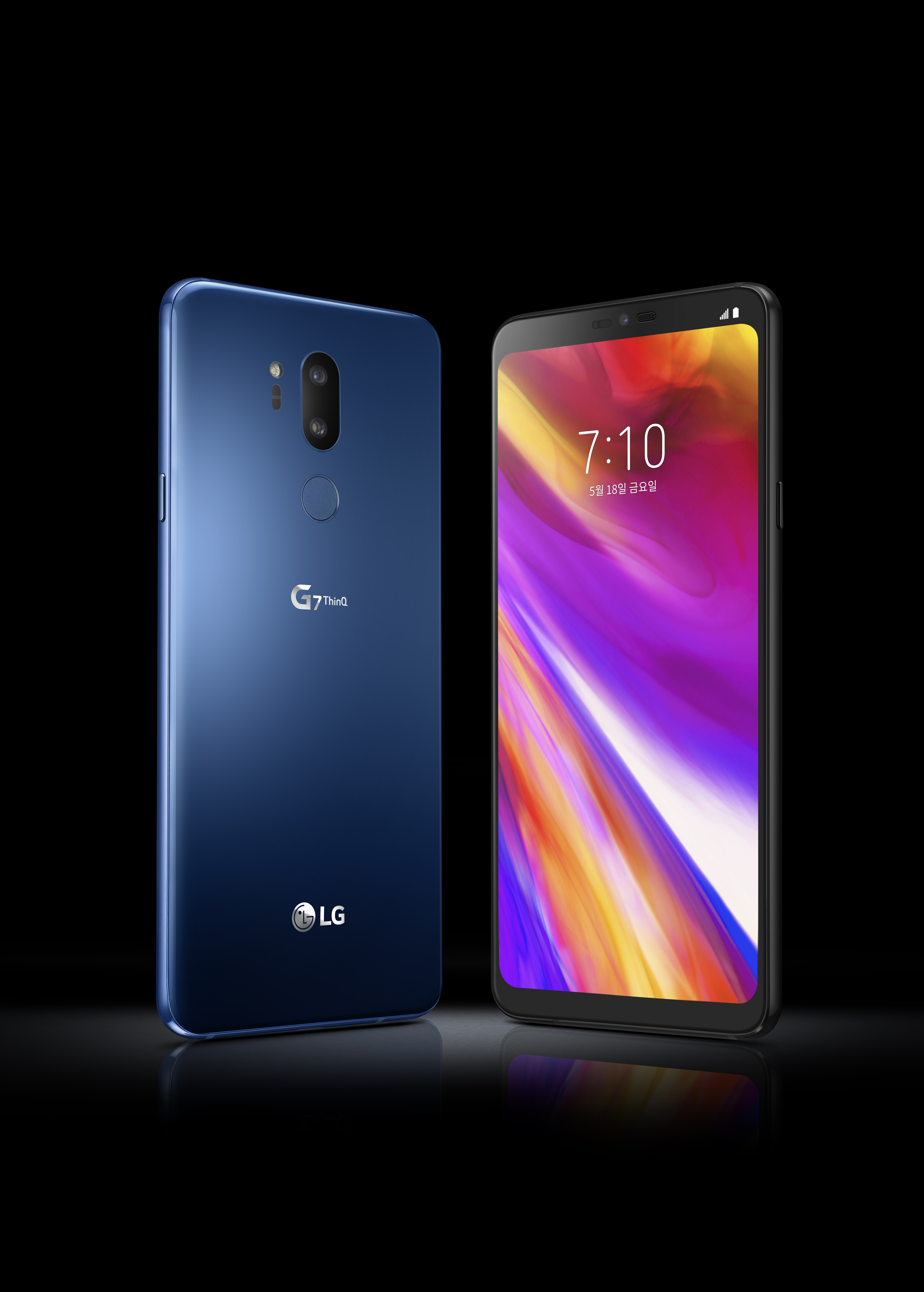
LG G7 ThinQ

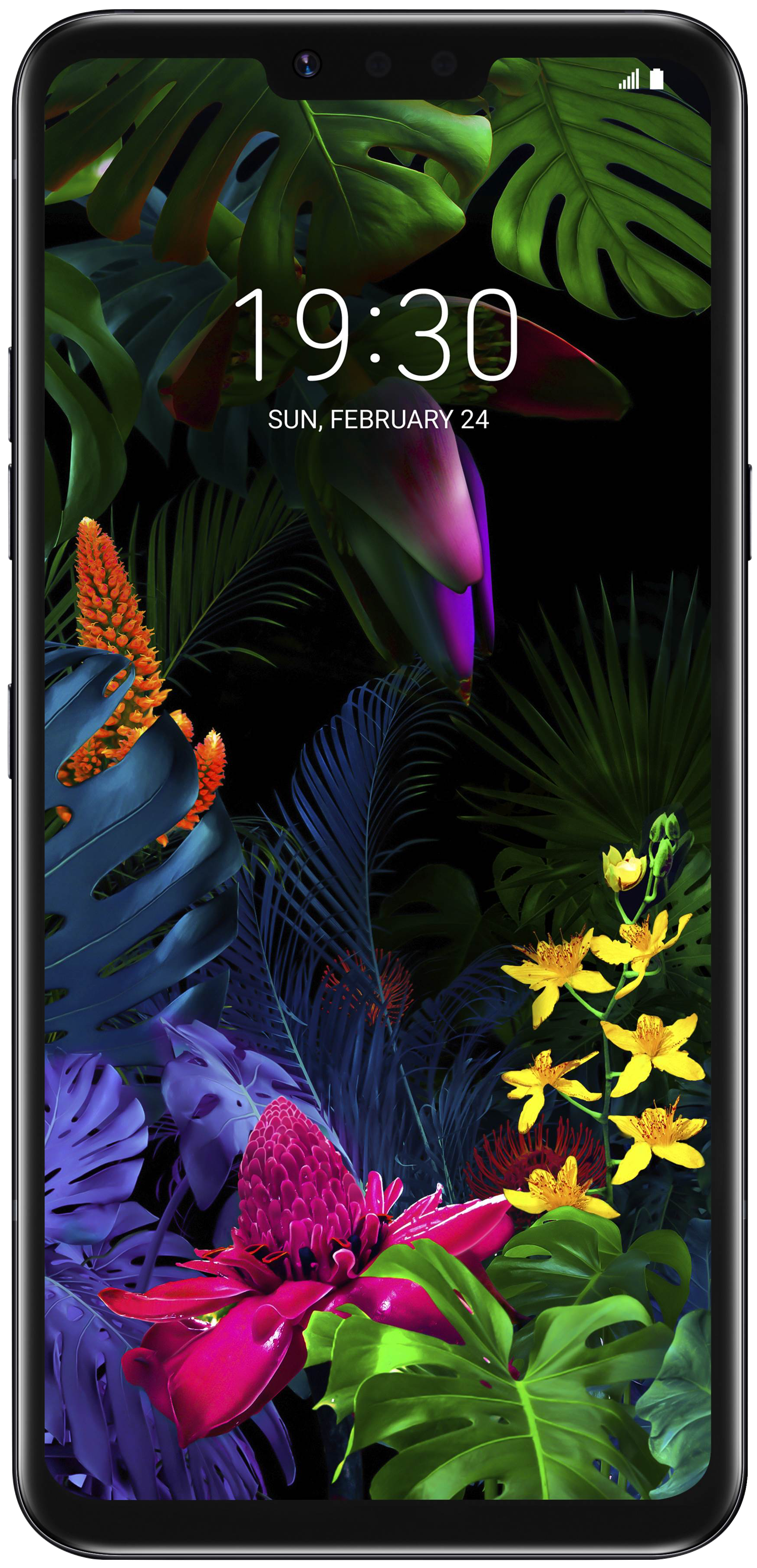
LG G8 ThinQ

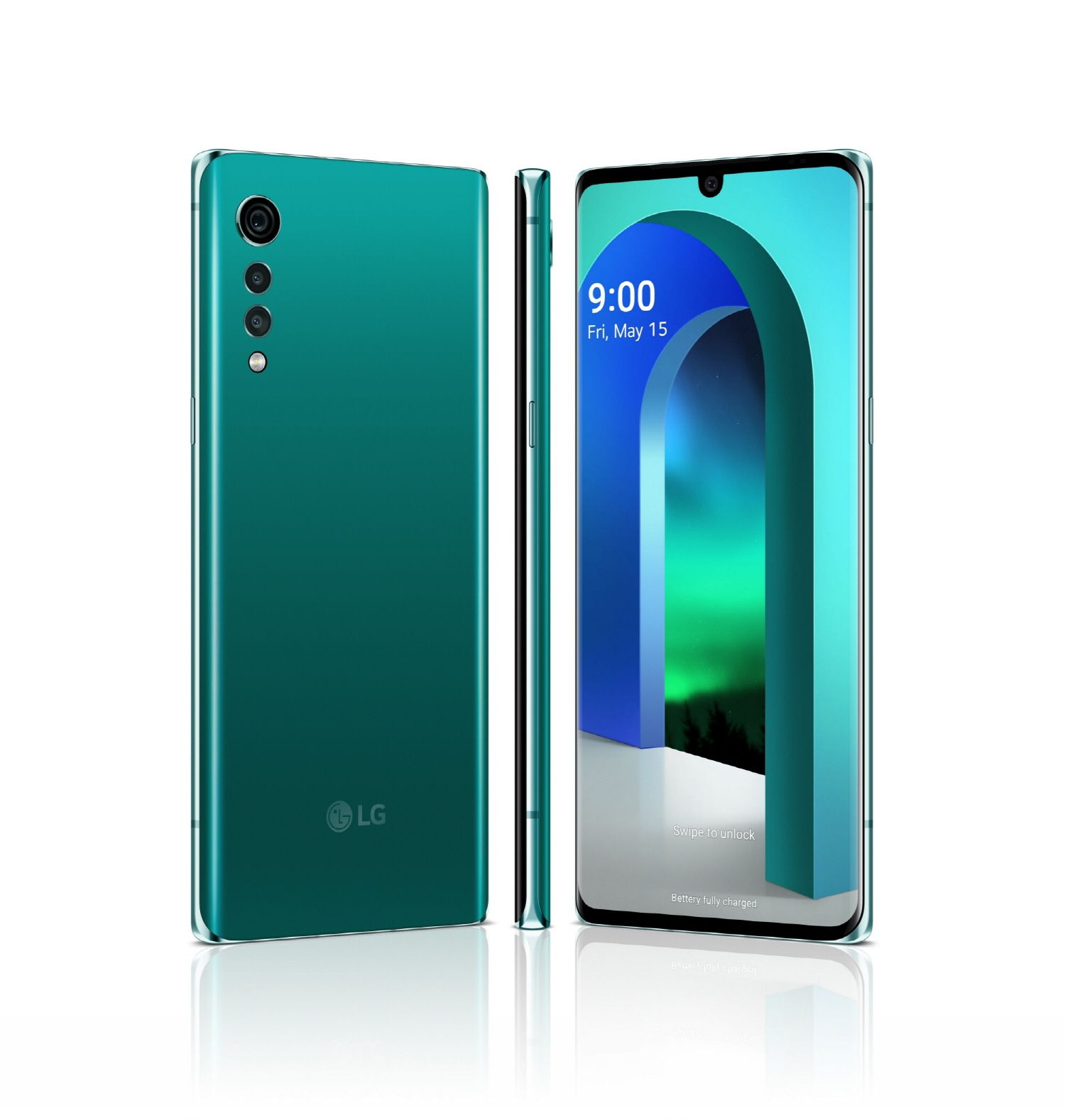
LG Velvet

== Phones ==
=== 2013 lineup ===
- LG Optimus G Pro
- LG G2
- LG G Pro Lite
- LG G2 Mini
- LG G Flex
- LG G Pro 2

=== 2014 lineup ===
- LG G3
- LG G3 Stylus
- LG G3 S, also known as LG G3 Beat, LG G3 Mini and LG G3 Vigor (AT&T, Sprint)
- LG G Pro 2
- LG Gx
- LG G Vista

=== 2015 lineup ===
- LG G4
- LG G4c, also known as the LG Magna
- LG G4 Stylus, also known in the U.S. as the LG G Stylo (Boost Mobile, Cricket Wireless, MetroPCS, Sprint, T-Mobile, Virgin Mobile)
- LG G4 Beat, also known as LG G4S
- LG G4 Vigor, (Virgin Mobile Canada)
- LG G Flex 2
- LG G Vista 2
- LG Tribute 2

=== 2016 lineup ===
- LG G5
- LG G5 SE
- LG Stylus 2 (Note: The LG Stylus 2 is the first and, as of late 2018, the last smartphone with a built-in DAB+ digital radio. Only specific regional variants, such as the K520K (Australia) and K520EMW (Europe), included DAB+ hardware and software support. Other variants (e.g., VS835, K520Y, and K535) do not include DAB+ functionality.) (also known as the LG G Stylus 2 or LG Stylo 2)
- LG Stylus 2 Plus

=== 2017 lineup ===
- LG G6
- LG G6+
- LG Stylus 3 (also known as the LG G Stylus 3 or LG Stylo 3)
- LG Stylo 3 Plus

=== 2018 lineup ===
- LG G7 ThinQ
- LG G7 One
- LG G7 Fit
- LG Stylo 4 (also known as the LG G Stylus 4 or LG Stylo 4)
- LG Stylo 4 Plus (also known as the LG Stylo 4+)

=== 2019 lineup ===
- LG G8 ThinQ
- LG G8s ThinQ
- LG G8x ThinQ
- LG Stylo 5

=== 2020-2021 lineup ===
- LG Velvet
- LG Velvet 2 Pro
- LG Stylo 6

== Tablets ==
- LG G Pad 7.0
- LG G Pad 8.0
- LG G Pad 8.3
- LG G Pad 10.1

== Watches ==
LG has produced a number of smartwatches; however, only a few of them carry the "LG G" branding. For example, the LG G Watch R is part of the LG G series, while its successor, the LG Watch Urbane, does not carry the "G" branding.

=== LG G Watch ===
LG and Google announced the Android Wear-based LG G Watch on June 25, 2014.

- Display: 1.65" LCD with 280x280 pixel resolution
- Processor: Qualcomm Snapdragon 400
- Storage: 4 GB
- RAM: 512 MB

=== LG G Watch R ===
LG and Google announced the LG G Watch R, also based on Android Wear, on October 25, 2014.

- Display: 1.3" circular P-OLED display with 320x320 pixel resolution
- Processor: Qualcomm Snapdragon 400
- Storage: 4 GB
- RAM: 512 MB

== See also ==
- LG K series
- LG Q series
- LG V series
- List of LG mobile phones
