= LG Optimus G =

Android smartphone designed and manufactured by LG Electronics

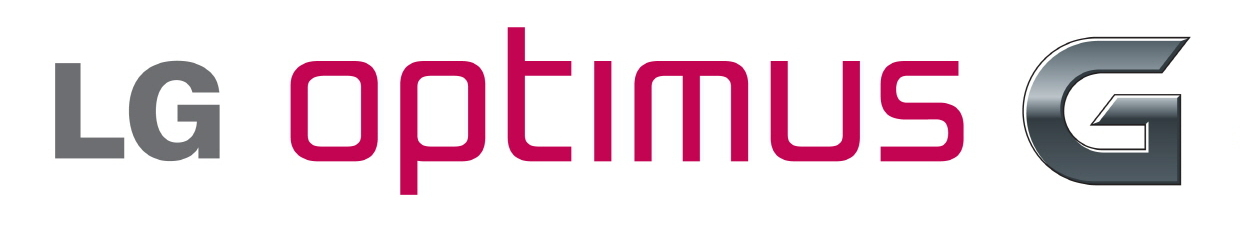

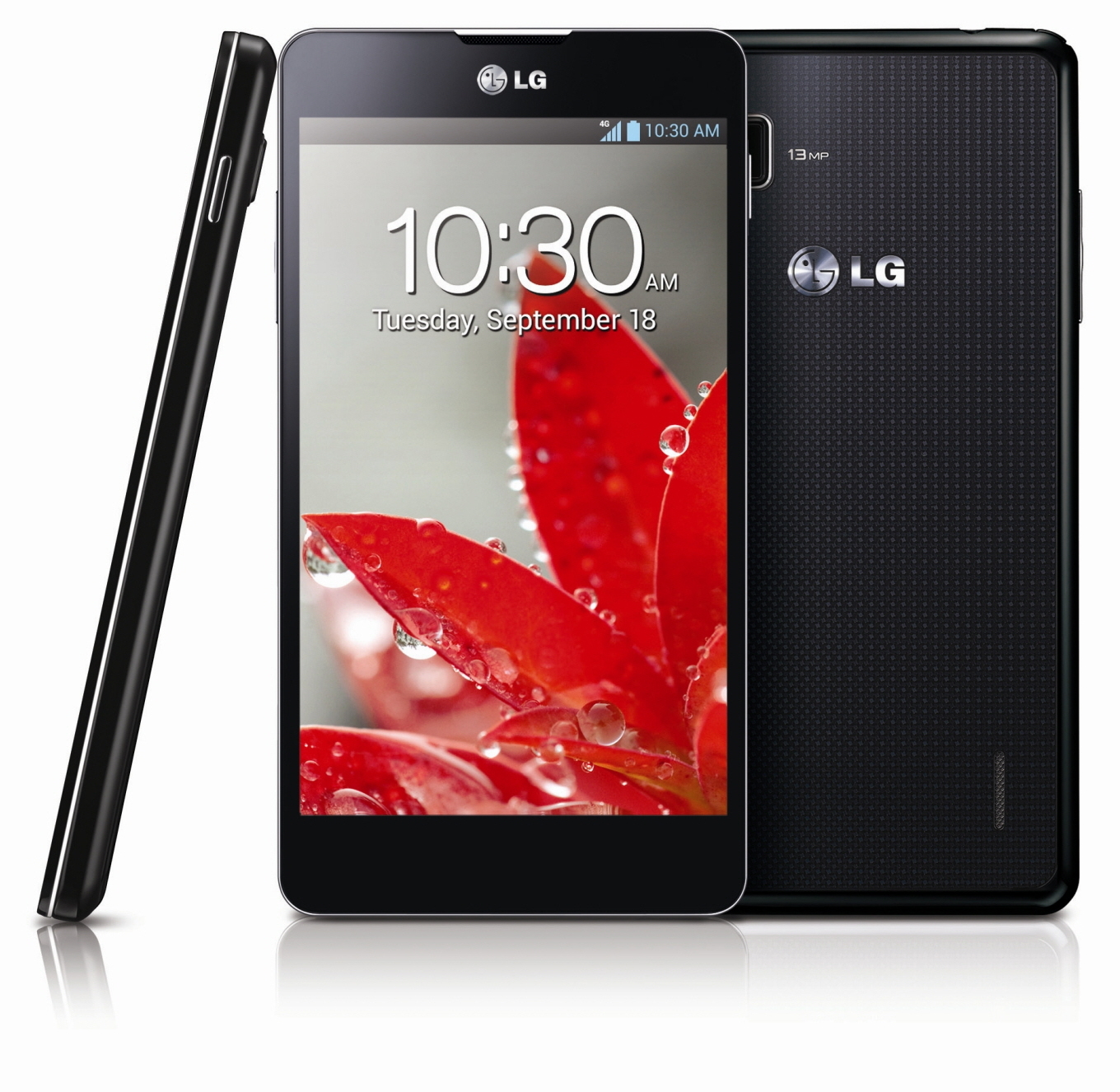
- Optimus G smartphone
- Manufacturer: LG Electronics
- Type: Smartphone
- Series: Optimus; G series
- First released: November 11, 2012
- Availability by region: November 11, 2012 (US and Canada)
- Predecessor: LG Optimus 4X HD
- Successor: LG G2
- Related: LG Optimus G Pro; Nexus 4
- Compatible networks: GSM (850 / 900 / 1800 / 1900), HSDPA, CDMA (Global 800 / 850 / 1900 & South Korea LG U+ Korean Pcs 1800), LTE
- Form factor: Bar
- Dimensions: 131.9 mm (5.19 in) H 68.9 mm (2.71 in) W 8.5 mm (0.33 in) D
- Weight: 145 g (5.11 oz)
- Operating system: Android 4.0.4 Ice Cream Sandwich; 4.1.2 Jelly Bean; 4.4.2 KitKat
- System-on-chip: Qualcomm Snapdragon S4 Pro APQ8064
- CPU: 1.5 GHz quad-core Qualcomm Krait
- GPU: Qualcomm Adreno 320
- Memory: 2 GB LPDDR2 RAM clocked at 533 MHz
- Storage: 16/32 GB
- Removable storage: Not available in the Global models microSD up to 64 GB AT&T & Japan & Taiwan
- Battery: Non-Removable Li-ion 2100 mAh (U.S, Canada, South Korea, Global variant); Removable Li-ion 2210 mAh (Japan variant); Removable Li-ion 2280 mAh (Taiwan variant)
- Rear camera: 13.0(Global)/8.0(AT&T) megapixels (market/carrier dependent) Back-illuminated sensor, LED flash HD video (1080p) at 30 frames/s Time catch shot, smart shutter and cheese shutter Simultaneous HD video and image recording, Smile and face detection, Image stabilization
- Front camera: 1.3 MP, HD video recording (720p)
- Display: 4.7 in (120 mm) diagonal "True HD" IPS LCD 768×1280
- Connectivity: 3.5 mm stereo audio jack Wi-Fi 802.11 a/b/g/n, Wi-Fi Hotspot, DLNA; Bluetooth 4.0 + A2DP micro-USB 2.0 (5-pin) port with mobile high-definition video link (MHL) for USB or HDMI connection
- Data inputs: Touch
- SAR: 0.70 W/kg (head); 1.06 W/kg (body)
- Other: 1-Seg (Japan), NOTTV(NTT DoCoMo), T-DMB(South Korea)

The LG Optimus G (retrospectively referred to unofficially as the LG Optimus G1, or LG G1) is an Android-based smartphone designed and manufactured by LG Electronics. It was announced on September 19, 2012; On January 18, 2013, LG announced that the device reached 1 million in sales four months after its release in Korea, Japan, Canada, and the U.S. The LG Optimus G is also closely related to the Nexus 4 with similar specifications and a similar design.

== Availability ==
=== North America ===
In the United States, the Optimus G was available through AT&T and Sprint. AT&T carried the 8-megapixel camera E970 model while Sprint offered the 13-megapixel LS970 model. The AT&T model was the only Optimus G model to feature a microSD-card memory expansion slot. These models were released on November 2 (AT&T) and November 11 (Sprint).

In Canada, the LG Optimus G was available from the country's three major mobile providers: Rogers Wireless, Bell Mobility and Telus Mobility, offering the E971 and E973 models respectively. Rogers was that country's only provider to sell the Optimus G with LTE band 7 2600 MHz support, as opposed to the more common AWS (band 4) and band 17 700 MHz LTE frequencies used by other North American carriers. This extra spectrum enables theoretical download speeds of up to 100 Mbit/s where available.

=== Japan ===
In Japan, the LG Optimus G was available from NTT DoCoMo as the L-01E. This Optimus G variant is similar to the E973 model with additional Japan-exclusive features such as FeliCa wallet support, a removable battery, a waterproof hydrophobic coating on all components and support for band 1 2100 mhz LTE. The phone is also available in a currently-exclusive Red color. Also, the LGL21 model was announced by KDDI's au featuring One-Seg broadcasting.

=== South Korea ===
In Korea, the Optimus G was available from SK Telecom & KT & LG U+ As The LG F-180S/K/L. This Optimus G variant is Korean model with additional Korea-exclusive features such as T-DMB support.

=== Taiwan ===
In Taiwan, it is sold as E975, but with minor differences.

=== India ===
In India, the LG Optimus G model is E975.

=== Europe ===
In February 2013, the E975 was launched in Sweden, France, Germany, Italy, Denmark, and other unspecified countries in March.

=== South America ===
The version that has been released to the public in Brazil and Chile is the E977 model.

== Hardware ==
=== Dimensions ===
The E973, E975, E977 and the LS970 models have an overall dimension of 131.9 mm x 68.9 mm x 8.5 mm, whereas the E970 model has 130.8 mm x 71.6 mm x 8.4 mm dimensions. The E973, E977 and the LS970 model weigh 144.9 grams whereas the E970 model weighs 147.1 grams.

=== Processor ===
The LG Optimus G is the first widely released device to feature the Qualcomm Snapdragon S4 Pro SoC. The Qualcomm Snapdragon S4 APQ8064 SoC features a Quad-core Krait processor clocked at 1.5 GHz. The processor is based on 28 nm semiconductor technology with Adreno 320 graphics processor running at 400 MHz.

=== Memory ===
The LG Optimus G has 2 GB of RAM and 32 GB of non-expandable internal storage in the LS970 and E973 models. However, AT&T offers the E970 model which has 16 GB of internal storage which may further be expanded via a microSD card up to 64 GB. A 16 GB card is also included in the AT&T & Japan & Taiwan model. The E975 model has 32 GB of internal storage of which 25 GB is available to the end user.

=== Screen ===
The phone features a 4.7" True HD IPS LCD of 768x1280 resolution and displaying 16,777,216 colors at 318 ppi pixel density. The screen is protected by Corning Gorilla Glass 2. There is Gorilla Glass on the back of the phone as well. The screen brightness is measured to be about 470 nits(cd/m^2). The screen also features a screen technology called zerogap touch.

=== Cameras ===
Depending on the market and the carrier, the LG Optimus G may have an 8 MP or a 13 MP back-illuminated camera sensor and a single LED flash. In the US, the AT&T model features the 8 MP camera and the Sprint version features the 13 MP camera. The phone is also capable of recording FullHD 1080p video at 30 FPS. The phone also features a front-facing 1.3 MP camera, capable of recording HD 720p video at 30 FPS. The Indian LG Optimus G features a 13 MP camera. The camera supports digital zoom of up to 8X magnification. The Canadian Rogers (E971) and Telus/Bell (E973) models also have 8 MP camera.

=== Battery ===
The LG Optimus G is powered by a standard Lithium-Polymer battery of 2100 mAh. The official standby time is quoted at 13.5 days and the 3G talk time is quoted at 10 hours.

== Software features and services ==
The LG Optimus G runs on Google's Android 4.0 Ice Cream Sandwich operating system skinned with LG Optimus UI 3.0. The LG Optimus G comes with many preloaded Android apps, including Google Chrome, Gmail, YouTube, Google+, and the Play Store. Most variants of the phone have since then been updated to Android 4.1 Jelly Bean, including the US models, Canadian model, European models, and the E975 model. Android 4.4.2 KitKat update is available now for Optimus G in South Korea (May 2014) and in India (July 2014) and is expected to hit other parts of the world in August–September 2014.

== Critical reception ==
LG Optimus G has received a generally favorable reception. CNET reviewed the LG Optimus G as being "Undoubtedly the best phone LG has ever offered" with a score of 8.3/10. Mobile Reviewer GSMArena.com has reviewed it as "Designed to a flagship standard and powered by the latest in handheld computing".

== See also ==
- Smartphone
- LG Optimus
