= LG G Pro 2 =

2014 flagship smartphone by LG Electronics

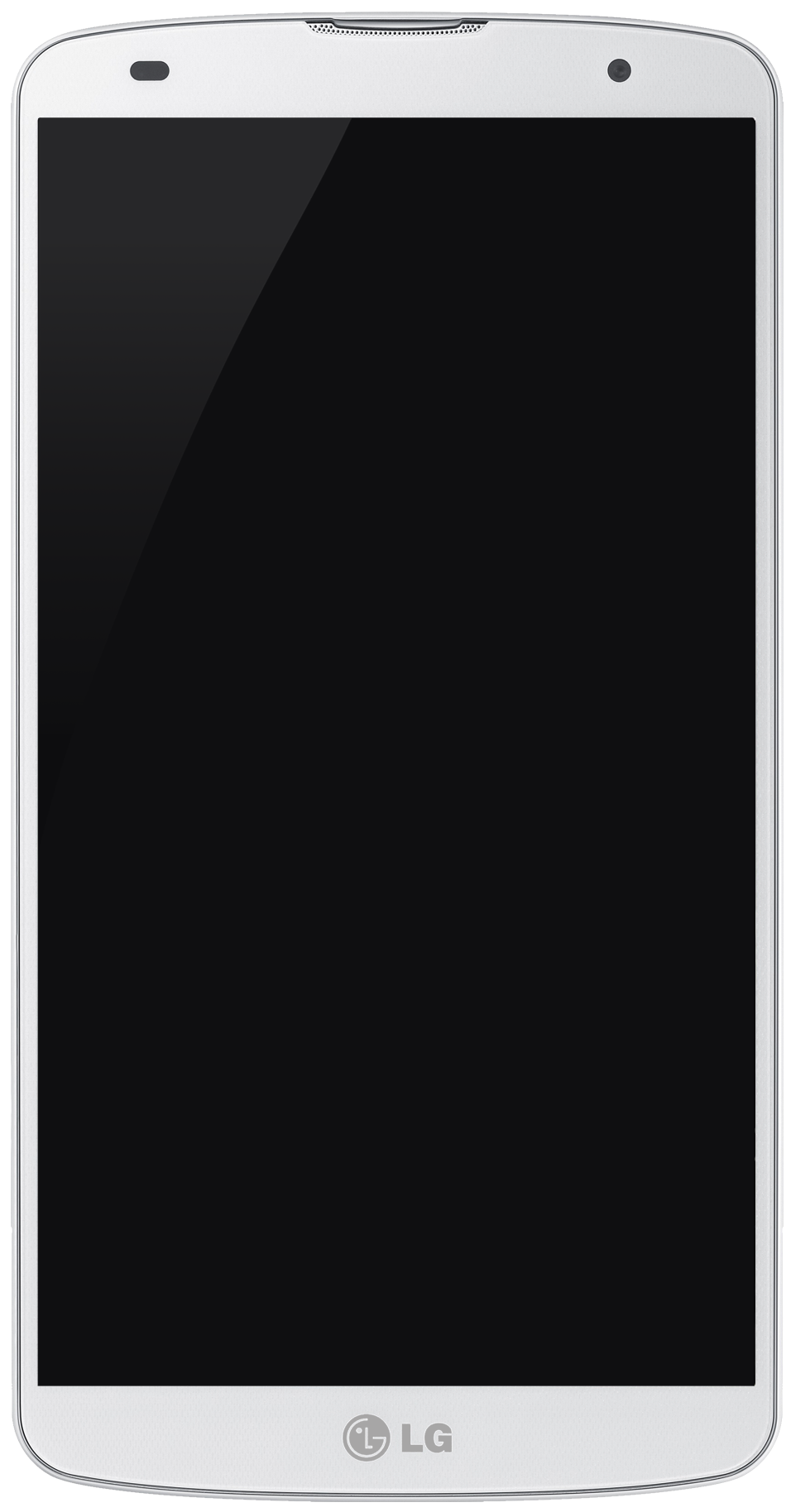
- LG G Pro 2 in White
- Brand: LG
- Manufacturer: LG Electronics
- Type: Phablet
- Series: LG G
- First released: March 18, 2014; 12 years ago
- Availability by region: March 18, 2014; 12 years ago
- Predecessor: LG Optimus G Pro
- Successor: LG V10
- Related: LG G2; LG G3
- Form factor: Slate
- Dimensions: 157.9 mm (6.22 in) H 81.9 mm (3.22 in) W 8.3 mm (0.33 in) D
- Weight: 172 g (6.1 oz)
- Operating system: Original: Android 4.4 "KitKat"; Current: Android 5.0.1 "Lollipop"
- System-on-chip: Qualcomm Snapdragon 800
- GPU: Adreno 330
- Memory: 3GB DDR3
- Storage: 16 or 32 GB eMMC
- Removable storage: microSD
- Battery: 3200mAh (Removable)
- Rear camera: 13.0MP OIS+
- Front camera: 2.1MP
- Display: 5.9" 1920x1080 IPS
- Sound: 4K
- Connectivity: List: Wi-Fi :802.11 a/b/g/n/ac (2.4/5 GHz); NFC; Bluetooth 4.0; USB; SlimPort
- Model: F-350

The LG G Pro 2 is a discontinued flagship Android-based phablet-sized smartphone manufactured, developed produced by LG Electronics. Serving as a successor to the LG Optimus G Pro, it was unveiled in February 12, 2014 during the 2014 Mobile World Congress in Barcelona, Spain, and released on March 18, 2014.

The phone comes in white or black. It has two RGB notification LEDs, one on the front and another on the back in the power button. It also supports the SlimPort video out standard. The volume and power buttons are at the back for easy accessibility with the index finger. The display is 5.9 inches diagonally - with an unusually wide screen of 82 mm / 3.22 inches.

== See also ==
- LG G series
- LG G2
- LG Optimus G Pro
- LG G Pro Lite
