= LG G3 =

Android smartphone by LG Electronics

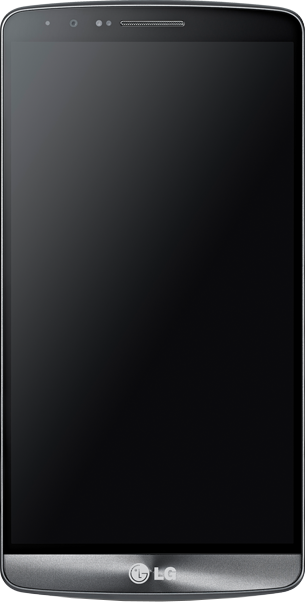
- LG G3 in metallic black
- Manufacturer: LG Electronics
- Type: Smartphone
- Series: G series
- First released: May 28, 2014
- Predecessor: LG G2
- Successor: LG G4
- Related: LG G Flex 2
- Compatible networks: GSM/GPRS/EDGE 850/900/1800/1900 MHz; CDMA 1.9 GHz CDMA PCS/800 MHz; WCDMA / LTE; TD-SCDMA 1900, 2000 MHz; TD-LTE (China Mobile Plus Network)
- Form factor: Slate
- Dimensions: 146.3 × 74.6 × 8.9 mm (5.76 × 2.94 × 0.35 in)
- Weight: 149 g (5.3 oz)
- Operating system: Original: Android 4.4.2 "KitKat"; Current: Android 6.0.1 "Marshmallow"
- System-on-chip: Qualcomm Snapdragon 801 MSM8974AC v3
- Memory: 2 GB (16 GB model); 3 GB (32 GB model)
- Storage: 16 or 32 GB
- Removable storage: microSDXC (up to 200 GB)
- Battery: 3,000 mAh, user-replaceable
- Rear camera: 13 MP Sony Exmor IMX135, 1/3.06 in OIS+, F2.4, dual-tone LED flash, hybrid infrared autofocus
- Front camera: 2.1 MP Sony Exmor IMX204, F2.0
- Display: 5.5 in (140 mm) 2560×1440 (534 ppi) 1440p IPS LCD
- Website: web.archive.org/web/20140530231405/http://www.lg.com/us/mobile-phones/g3

The LG G3 is an Android smartphone developed by LG Electronics as part of the LG G series. First released in South Korea on May 28, 2014, it is a successor to 2013's LG G2. Inheriting design elements from the G2, such as its thin screen bezels and rear-mounted power and volume buttons, the G3 is distinguished primarily by being the first smartphone from a major manufacturer to incorporate a 1440p display, and its inclusion of an infrared hybrid autofocus system for its camera. Its video resolution has been upgraded to 2160p (4K). LG also touted the device's plastic "metallic skin"—designed to give the device a higher quality appearance, and a "simpler" user interface with an integrated intelligent personal assistant system. The battery can be quickly changed by the user, allowing charged spare batteries to be carried.

The G3 received mostly positive reviews, with critics praising the overall appearance, performance, and software of the device. LG was panned for using a faux metallic plastic instead of an actual metal material for its exterior.

The 1440p display was also considered bleeding edge technology, citing poor brightness levels, high battery power consumption and the use of artificial sharpening. 10 million units of the G3 were sold in the device's first 11 months on sale.

== Development ==
=== Exterior ===
One of the major goals of the G3 was to provide a simpler overall experience than other smartphones; Jong-Seok Park, president of LG's mobile division, argued that "the smartest innovation in a fast-evolving smartphone market is creating harmony between advanced technology and a simplified user experience." While developing the G3, LG designers produced at least 300 different design prototypes, with various button layouts, materials, and finishes. The company aimed to address criticisms faced by the G2's design—whose "glossy" plastic chassis was panned for having a plain appearance and for attracting finger smudges. The finishing of the G3 was designed to look and feel like brushed metal, whilst resisting smudging and scratching, and not feeling cold to touch. While LG considered using the "self-healing" coating from the G Flex, LG's vice president of mobile design Chul Bae Lee stated that they could not use it without making the phone glossy.

The rear buttons of the G2 were retained, but with a more circular shape that is separated from the camera area; the new design is intended to prevent users from accidentally smudging the camera lens when using the buttons.

The thin bezels of the G3, along with its curved shape, are intended to help improve grip and make the device feel smaller than it actually is, given its screen size.

=== Battery optimizations ===
While the G3's battery has the same capacity as the G2, a subtly-curved "arc battery" had to be designed so it could fit under the G3's curved rear cover. To achieve battery life comparable to other "1080p flagship" devices—especially given the significantly higher resolution of its screen, several optimization measures are implemented in the G3's software. These include capping the frame rate rendered when the screen is displaying static content, and underclocking the processor when the device is not running processor-intensive applications.

With these optimizations, LG demonstrated that the G3 could play video for six and a half hours at full screen brightness on a single charge.

=== Laser auto focus ===
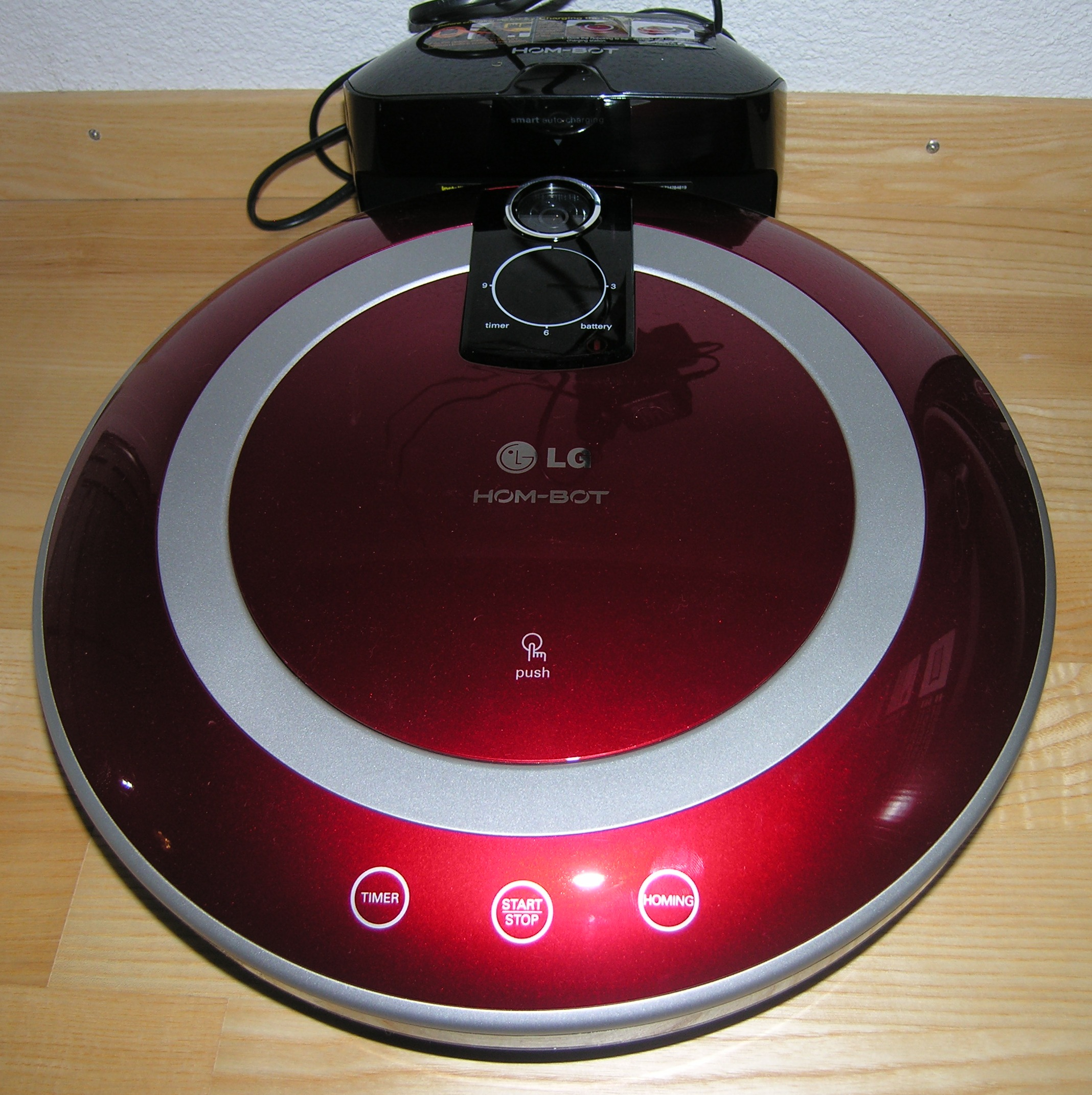
The laser autofocus system uses a component originally designed for LG robotic vacuums.

The G3 incorporates a "laser autofocus" system, being among the first smartphones to incorporate such a feature. Based on technology that was being researched for the LG Roboking robotic vacuum cleaner line, but ultimately left unused, the system uses a cone-shaped infrared beam to map the depth and position of objects; this data can be combined with traditional autofocus mechanisms, and face detection capabilities. LG claimed that this system gave the G3 the fastest autofocus time of any smartphone, 276 milliseconds.

Other recent phones, such as the HTC One (M8) and Samsung Galaxy S5, had boasted autofocus times of 300 milliseconds. The introduction of the laser into the G3's feature set occurred late in development, and the majority of the mockups were not designed to compensate for its presence, requiring additional tweaks to the phone's shape.

== Specifications ==
=== Hardware ===
==== Exterior ====
The G3's exterior incorporates a scratch-resistant "metallic skin"—consisting of polycarbonate finished to look and feel like brushed metal; despite being branded as "metallic", the G3's exterior does not use actual metal. The finishing is intended primarily to improve grip, and to make the rear casing less susceptible to fingerprint smudging. The G3 is available in black, white, gold, burgundy, and violet color finishes. Design elements from the G2 are retained by the G3, such as its rear-mounted volume and power buttons. In comparison to the G2, the buttons were given a flatter design with a new, rounded shape.

==== Display ====
The G3 features a 5.5 in (140 mm), 1440p quad HD IPS LCD—the first major "global" smartphone to use such a display. As with the G2, the G3 was designed with minimal screen bezels to ensure a compact form.

==== Storage and chipsets ====
The G3 features a 2.5 GHz quad-core Qualcomm Snapdragon 801 system-on-chip; variants with 16 GB of internal storage have 2 GB of RAM, while variants with 32 GB of internal storage have 3 GB of RAM.

==== Battery ====
The G3 includes a 3,000 mAh battery. Unlike with the predecessor LG G2, the G3's rear cover is removable, allowing the battery to be replaced, and storage to be expanded up to 200 GB with currently-available microSD cards.

==== Cameras ====
The G3's 13-megapixel rear-facing camera uses the Sony Exmor RS IMX135 image sensor model, includes optical image stabilization and a dual-tone flash, along with a hybrid autofocus system. The time-of-flight camera system, also known as “laser autofocus”, uses a thin infrared laser beam to calculate the distance between the camera and its subject. In situations where data from the infrared autofocus is unreliable, the camera falls back on contrast autofocus. LG touted that the hybrid system gave the G3 the then fastest focus time of then any smartphone, and that the infrared autofocus would also be beneficial in low-light situations.

The LG G3 is the first mobile phone that is able to record optically stabilized 2160p (4K) video.

==== Wireless charging ====
The G3 natively supports Qi wireless charging, except on models sold in Korea and the United States due to restrictions imposed by carriers. Wireless charging is only available on models sold in these regions if the QuickCircle case accessory is installed.

==== Connectivity ====
802.11ac WiFi is supported, as is satellite navigation using GPS and GLONASS satellites. There are different models for different regions, with appropriate telephone bands, some models also having FM radio support.

=== Software ===
The LG G3 shipped with Android 4.4 "KitKat" and LG's proprietary user interface and software suite G UI. The G3's user interface was revised with a flatter visual appearance than the G2, "mature" color schemes, new icons and the use of Roboto as the default font. New software features introduced by the G3 include the intelligent personal assistant "Smart Notice"—which presents context-sensitive notifications and suggestions using natural language, the fitness tracker LG Health, an updated "Smart Keyboard" with adjustable key height and the ability to analyze the user's typing habits to personalize its behavior, remote device locking and wiping, and "Content Lock"—the ability to store files in a secure, private area, either in internal storage or on the SD card.

The G3's camera software also received a revised user interface; by default, most options are hidden, and photos can be taken by merely tapping on the subject in the viewfinder. The G3 also offers the background defocus tool "Magic Focus", and a gesture-activated self-timer mode for the front-facing camera.

On November 9, 2014, LG announced that the G3 would receive an update to Android 5.0 "Lollipop". The update was first released in Poland and South Korea in November 2014. The availability and release dates of the update in other markets, such as Europe and North America, varied. The update re-styles the interface to adhere to Material design language and other changes introduced by Lollipop. It also adds syncing of periodic heart rate readings by G Watch R smartwatches with the LG Health app.

In December 2015, LG began to release an update to Android 6.0 "Marshmallow".

As of 2024, all variants of LG G3 can be upgraded to Android 11 via LineageOS 18.1

=== Accessories ===
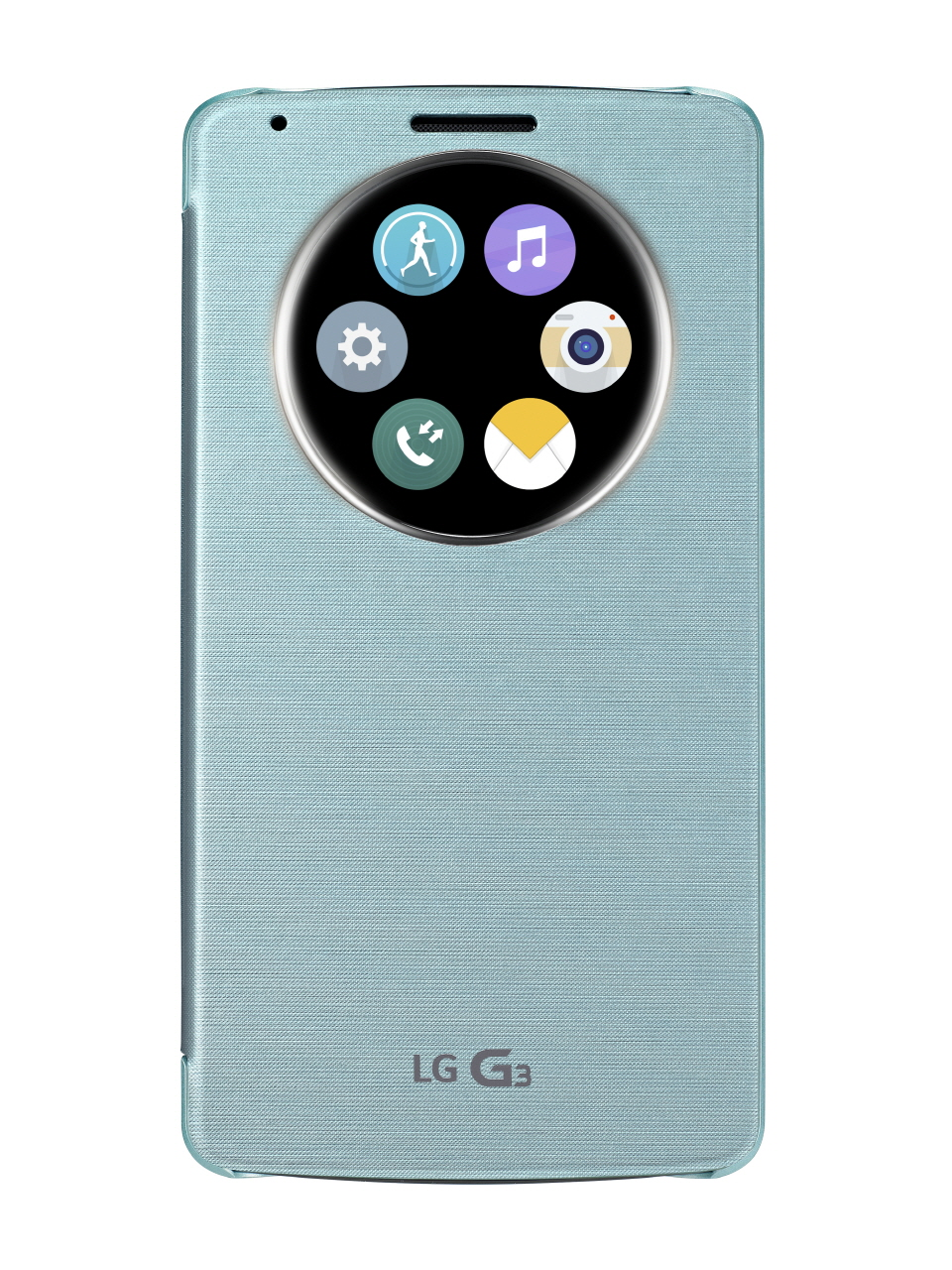
LG G3 Quick Circle Case

Prior to the unveiling of the G3 itself, LG unveiled the device's QuickCircle Case accessory. A successor to the QuickWindow Case produced for the G2, the case consists of a flip cover with a circular window near the top. A glow effect around the rim of the window is used to signify notifications, and a number of apps—including the camera, music player, and phone—can be used from a special circular interface without opening the phone. The case also enables the use of wireless charging on G3 models sold in Korea and the United States.

In February 2015, LG introduced a virtual reality headset shell for the phone known as VR for G3. Compatible with the Google Cardboard ecosystem, it was distributed as a free accessory alongside G3 devices sold in South Korea following its release..

== Reception ==
The G3 was met with positive reception from critics. The G3's plastic rear cover was praised for being less susceptible to fingerprint smudging than the G2 — however, LG was criticized for using an imitation metal finish rather than actual metal. In comparison to smartphones explicitly marketed as phablets, such as the Galaxy Note series, the G3 was considered to be more "comfortable" and phone-like for its size due to its compact form and smooth exterior. The high-end hardware of the G3 was also noted, with Engadget describing its specifications as being "[like] an Android fan's wishlist", but that from a usability standpoint, the screen's size would "[definitely] be a stretch for some people". The revised appearance of the G3's user interface was praised for having a cleaner look and feel than previous iterations, although The Verge did acknowledge that more Android OEMs were standardizing the appearance of their interface designs to closer resemble the design used by Google's "stock" distribution of the Android operating system.

The G3's display was praised for having good color reproduction, brightness, and viewing angles, with Engadget noting that its 1440p sample content "[looked] pin-sharp and beautifully recreated." However, critics were mixed on whether the display provided any sufficient advantages or difference in quality over a 1080p display for everyday use, also given that content optimized for the resolution was not yet readily available. Ars Technica showed concern over the display's potential effects on battery usage, and argued that the Samsung Galaxy S5 had a better contrast ratio and was easier to see outdoors. Mobile Syrup regarded the G3's display quality as inferior to the preceding G2, noting the lower maximum brightness (including the G3's software-based screen dimming algorithms), reduced viewing angles and color richness, due to sacrifices that LG made to maintain the G3's battery life. Anandtech was also mixed, noting that the G3's display produced "obviously oversaturated colors in almost every situation", had a weaker backlight than the G2, and used a software edge enhancement system that resulted in noticeable visual artifacts. While asserting that the 1440p display affected battery life, it was noted that in comparison to its competitors, the G3's battery life was still "firmly above what we've seen from 2013 (Snapdragon 600) flagships".

In its first eleven months on sale, nearly 10 million units of the G3 were sold.

== See also ==
Preceded by LG G2	LG G3; 2014	Succeeded by LG G4
