= LG Optimus G Pro =

Smartphone/tablet designed and manufactured by LG Electronics

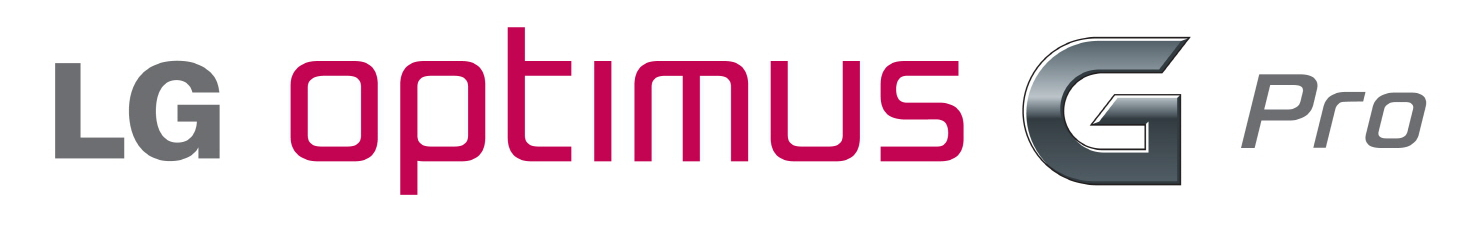

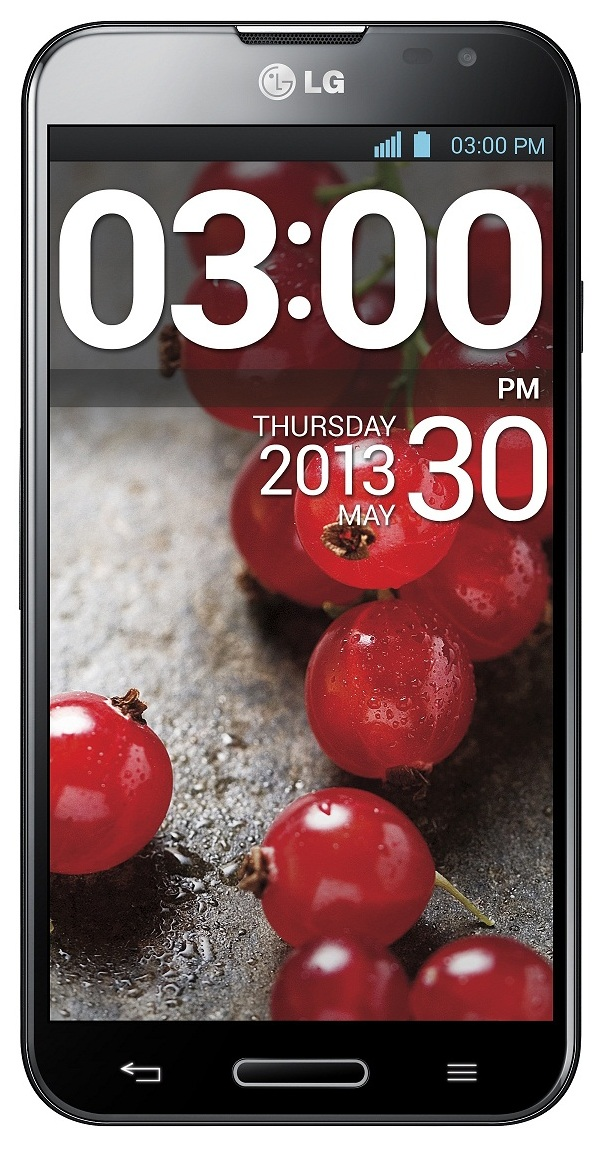
- Manufacturer: LG Electronics
- Type: Smartphone
- Series: Optimus; G series
- First released: May 2013
- Availability by region: April 4, 2013 (Japan, as L-04E); May 2013 (US and Canada)
- Successor: LG G Pro 2
- Related: LG Optimus G LG G2
- Compatible networks: GSM (850 / 900 / 1800 / 1900), HSDPA, LTE, CDMA Korean PCS 1.8 GHz (LG U+ Plus Network)(Global Variant); TD-LTE & TD-SCDMA(China Mobile Variant)
- Form factor: Slate
- Dimensions: 150.2 mm (5.91 in) H 76.1 mm (3.00 in) W 9.4 mm (0.37 in)
- Weight: 172 g (6.07 oz)
- Operating system: Original: Android 4.1.2 "Jelly Bean; Current: Android 4.4.2 "KitKat"; Android 4.2 Jelly Bean (China Mobile Variant) upgradable to Android 4.4.2 KitKat
- System-on-chip: Qualcomm Snapdragon 600, 28nm LP
- CPU: 1.7 GHz quad-core Qualcomm Krait, 2 MB L2 Cache
- GPU: Qualcomm Adreno 320
- Memory: 2 GB LP-DDR3 RAM
- Storage: 16 & 32 GB
- Removable storage: microSDXC up to 64 GB
- Battery: Li-Ion 3140 mAh (Global Variant); Li-ion 2940 mAh(China Mobile Variant)
- Rear camera: 13.0 megapixels Back-illuminated sensor, LED flash HD video (1080p) at 30 frames/s Time catch shot, smart shutter and cheese shutter Simultaneous HD video and image recording, Smile and face detection, Image stabilization
- Front camera: 2.1 MP, HD video recording (1080p)
- Display: 5.5 in (140 mm) diagonal "True HD" IPS LCD 1080×1920 pixels, Corning Gorilla Glass 2
- Connectivity: 3.5 mm stereo audio jack Wi-Fi 802.11 a/b/g/n, Wi-Fi Hotspot, DLNA; Bluetooth 4.0 + A2DP micro-USB 2.0 (5-pin) port with mobile high-definition video link (MHL) for USB or HDMI connection, NFC
- Data inputs: Touch

The LG Optimus G Pro is an Android-based smartphone designed and manufactured by LG Electronics. It was released in the U.S. on May 10, 2013.

== Availability ==
=== North America ===
In the United States, the Optimus G Pro was available through AT&T for $99.99 with a 2-year contract and data plan. At release, it was priced at $199.99.

=== Japan ===
In Japan, the "L-04E" model was announced by NTT Docomo on January 22, 2013. It was released on April 4, featuring One-Seg.

== Specifications ==
=== Hardware ===
==== Processor ====
The LG Optimus G Pro features a Qualcomm Snapdragon 600 APQ8064 SoC with a Quad-core Krait processor clocked at 1.7 GHz. The processor is based on 28 nm semiconductor technology with Adreno 320 graphics processor running at 400 MHz.

==== Memory ====
The LG Optimus G Pro has 2 GB of RAM and 16\32 GB of internal storage which may be expanded via a microSD card up to 64 GB.

==== Screen ====
The phone features a 5.5" True HD IPS LCD of 1080x1920 resolution and displaying 16,777,216 colors at ~401 PPI pixel density.

==== Cameras ====
The LG Optimus G Pro has a 13 MP back-illuminated camera sensor and a single LED flash for both AT&T and Sprint. The phone is also capable of recording FullHD 1080p video at 30 FPS. The phone also features a front-facing 2.1 MP camera, capable of recording HD 720p video at 30 FPS. The Indian LG Optimus G Pro features a 13 MP camera. The camera supports digital zoom of up to 8X magnification.

==== Battery ====
The LG Optimus G is powered by a standard Lithium-Polymer battery of 3140 mAh.

=== Software ===
The LG Optimus G runs on Google's Android 4.1.2 Jelly Bean operating system skinned with LG Optimus UI 3.0. LG has released the Android 4.4 KitKat firmware update on March 21, 2014 for LG Optimus G Pro. It was customizable with LG's interface customization "QSlide".

== Critical reception ==
LG Optimus G Pro has received a generally favorable reception. CNET reviewed it as "a great performer" with a score of 4 out of 5 stars. PhoneNews reviewed it "a feature laden handset with excellent software". DongA Science dubbed this phone as "the best smartphone".

== See also ==
- LG Optimus series
