= LG K62 =

2020 Android phablet manufactured by LG Electronics

LG K62/K52 (LG K62+ in Brazil) (LG Q52 in South Korea)
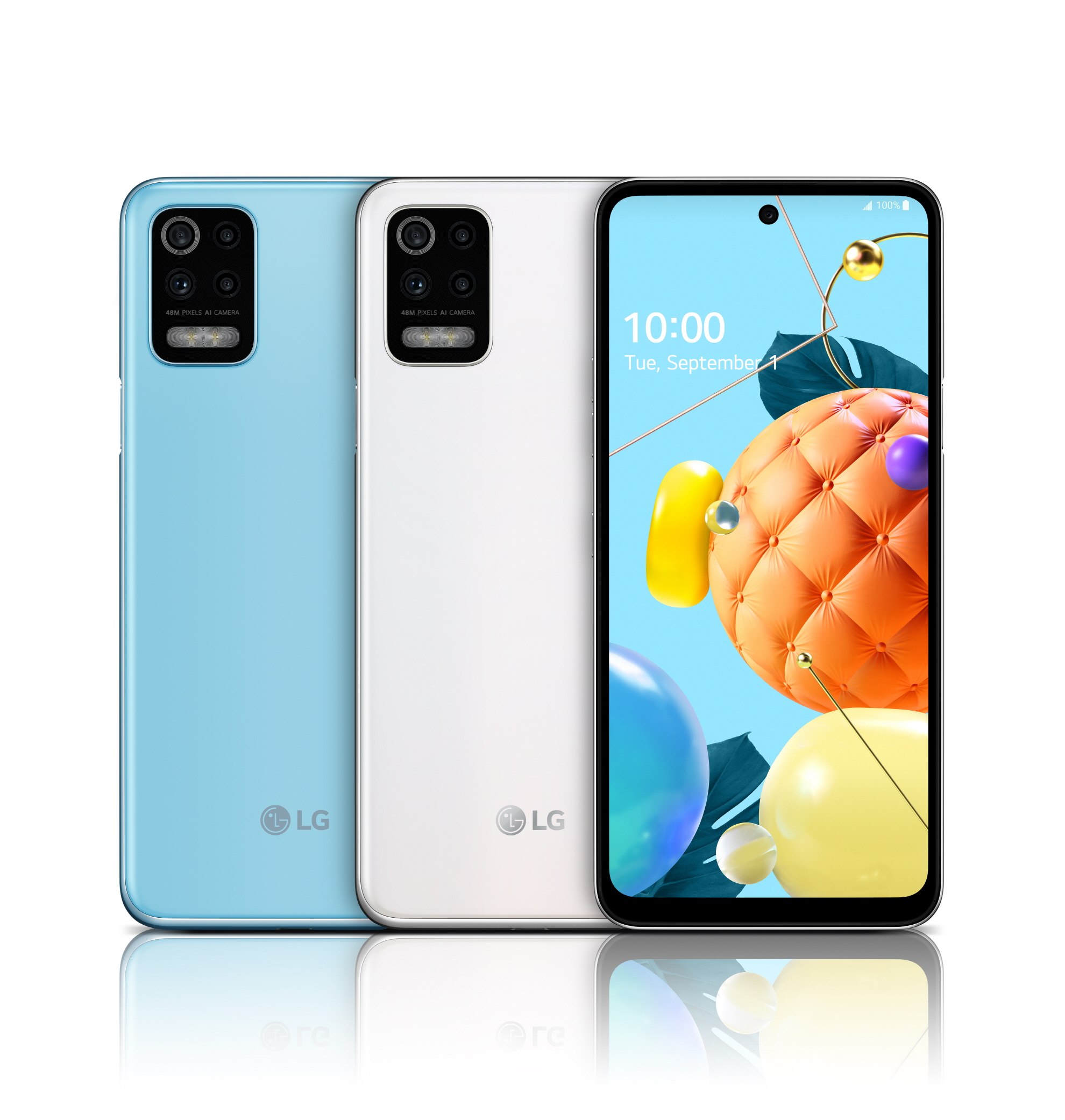
- LG K62
- Brand: LG K series
- Manufacturer: LG Electronics
- Type: Smartphone
- Series: LG K
- First released: K62/52: 23 September 2020; 5 years ago Q52: 26 September 2020; 5 years ago
- Availability by region: 27 November 2020; 5 years ago Brazil: K62+ South Korea: Q52
- Predecessor: LG K52; LG K61
- Successor: LG K92 5G
- Related: LG K31; LG K41; LG K51; LG K71; LG K22; LG K42
- Compatible networks: 2G GSM – 850, 900, 1800, 1900 MHz, SIM 1 and SIM 2; 3G HSDPA – 850, 900, 1900, 2100 MHz; 4G LTE - 1, 2, 3, 4, 5, 7, 8, 12, 13, 17, 28, 38, 66 (North America); 1, 3, 5, 7, 28, 40 (Brazil)
- Form factor: Slate
- Dimensions: 165 mm (6.5 in) x 76.7 mm (3.02 in) x 8.4 mm (0.33 in)
- Weight: 186 g (6.6 oz)
- Operating system: Original: Android 10 with LG UX 9 Current: Android 12 with LG UX
- System-on-chip: Mediatek MT6765 Helio P35 (12nm)
- CPU: Octa-core; 4x2.3 GHz Cortex-A53 & 4x1.8 GHz Cortex-A53
- GPU: PowerVR GE8320
- Memory: 4 GB of RAM
- Storage: 64 or 128 GB of internal storage
- Removable storage: microSDXC, expandable up to 1 TB
- Battery: Non-removable lithium polymer 4000 mAh battery
- Rear camera: 48 MP (standard), f/1.8, 1/2", 0.8 μm with PDAF 5 MP (wide), f/2.2, 1/5", 1.12 μm 2 MP (macro), f/2.4 2 MP (depth), f/2.4 Dual-LED flash, panorama, HDR 1080p@30fps recording
- Front camera: 28 MP; HDR; 1080p@30fps recording
- Display: IPS LCD capacitive touchscreen, 6.6 in (170 mm), 720 × 1600 1080p, (20:9 aspect ratio, ~266 ppi density)
- Sound: Stereo speakers, 3.5mm headphone jack
- Connectivity: Wi-Fi 802.11 a/b/g/n/ac, dual-band, Wi-Fi Direct, DLNA, hotspot, Bluetooth 5.0, A2DP, LE, dual-band A-GPS, GLONASS, BDS
- Model: LMK525H, LMK525, LM-K525H, LM-K525
- Other: MIL-STD-810G compliant, fingerprint (side-mounted), accelerometer, proximity, compass

The LG K62 (also known as LG K52) is a mid-range Android smartphone manufactured by LG Electronics, announced and released in September 2020 and released worldwide in November 2020, along with LG K22, LG K42 and LG K52 released in September 2020, as the 4th phone for the 6th generation of the LG K series phones lineup. The phone is similar to its predecessor, LG K61. But it has 28 MP front camera, flaunts a smooth, silky matte glass finish that's fingerprint resistant, fingerprint sensor on the side, LG 3D Sound Engine, wide-screen display with 20:9 ratio and the camera arranged on a square along with the dual-LED flash sensor, similar to the Samsung Galaxy A12's camera array.

In Brazilian authorized markets, the model line was shifted and the K62 was sold as the LG K62+, the K52 as LG K62, and the K42 as LG K52.

In South Korea on October 25, 2020, it was sold under the name LG Q52, was announced, which is a rebranding of the LG K52.

== Specifications ==
=== Design ===
The frame is matte plastic on the K62. The display occupies 83.1% of the front, and a waterdrop notch is used for the front camera. The fingerprint scanner is integrated into the power button and is located on the right side, with a dedicated Google Assistant button and volume buttons on the left. At the bottom, there is a single speaker, a USB-C charging port, and a microphone. The main camera is located on the rear panel, in the upper left corner, protruding as a black block with a chrome frame. In the block, besides the camera, there is an LED flash. All phones are protected by the MIL-STD-810G standard.

The LG K62 measures itself at 165 x 76.7 x 8.4 mm (6.50 x 3.02 x 0.33 in) and weighs at 186 g (6.56 oz). It is available only either with White, Sky Blue or Red.

=== Display ===
The LG K62 has a wide 6.6-inch Infinity-O IPS LCD, with 720 x 1600 pixels resolution and 20:9 aspect ratio, ~83.1% screen-to-body ratio, ~266 ppi density.

=== Hardware ===
The LG K62 is powered by the chipset Mediatek MT6765 Helio P35 (12 nm), an Octa-core (4x2.3 GHz Cortex-A53 & 4x1.8 GHz Cortex-A53) CPU and a PowerVR GE8320 GPU.

=== Cameras ===
The LG K62 has a 4 AI cameras array arranged on a square, similar to that design of Samsung Galaxy A12's camera array, along with a dual-LED flash sensor.

- 48 megapixels, f/1.8 (standard) (wide-angle), 1/2.0", 0.8 μm with PDAF
- 5 megapixels, f/2.2, 115˚ (ultra wide, x0.5), 1/5.0", 1.12 μm
- 2 megapixels, f/2.4, (macro)
- 2 megapixels, f/2.4, (depth)

The LG K62 also has a 28 megapixels punch-hole camera on the front.

The K52 and Q52 use a wide-angle 13 MP f/2.0 module, and it also record a video at the same resolution of 1080p at 30fps.

=== Software ===
All smartphones were shipped with Android 10 (Queen Cake) and use LG UX 9 shell. Subsequently, on November 30, 2021, LG K52 and K62 received an update to Android 11. Q52, in addition to the update to Android 11, also received on August 30, 2022 to the next version Android 12.

== See also ==
- Samsung Galaxy A51
- Sony Xperia L4
