= LG K series =

Line of mid-range smartphones

- Developer: LG
- Type: Smartphones
- Operating system: Android

The LG K series is a line of mid-range smartphones which are designed, developed and marketed by LG Electronics, which run the Android mobile operating system.

The K Series, which launched in January 2016 with the K7 and K10, was followed by the K4, later that same month. The K8 debuted soon after in February that year, finishing out the 2016 lineup with the K3 in August.

In December 2016, LG Electronics announced the updated phones for 2017 of K3, K4, K8, K10, alongside the K20 Plus, which then released a few days later, and a "V" models for Verizon Communications. Four months later, LG announced the updated K7, completing the 2017 lineup.

Carriers include: ACG, AT&T, Boost Mobile, Cricket, LRA, Metro by T-Mobile, Republic Wireless, Spectrum, Sprint, T-Mobile, Unlocked, US Cellular, Verizon, Virgin Mobile, and Xfinity Mobile.

== Phones ==
=== 1st generation (2016 lineup) ===
Release timeline
2016	LG K10
2016	LG K7
2016	LG K4
2016	LG K8
2016	LG K5
2016	LG K3
2016	LG K20 plus

The first generation of the LG K series includes the first phones, LG K10, LG K7 and LG K4. They were launched in January 2016, and were followed by the LG K8, which was launched in February 2016, and later in March 2016, LG launched the LG K5, and followed it with the LG K3, which was launched in August 2016. The latest phone in 2016 for the LG K series was the LG K20 plus.

==== LG K10 ====
LG K10 was the first phone, launched in January 2016 as the K series phone, along with LG K7. It has a 5.3-inch screen, powered by a Qualcomm Snapdragon 410 chipset processor, 13-megapixels camera and a 2300 mAh battery.

==== LG K7 ====
LG K7 was the second phone, launched in January 2016 as the K series phone, along with LG K10. It comes with a 5-inch screen, 5-megapixels main and front cameras and a 2125 mAh battery.

==== LG K4 ====
LG K4 was the third phone, launched in January 2016 as the K series phone. It has a 4.5-inch screen, a sleek design and a 2-megapixels front camera. It launched along with LG K7 and LG K10 in the same month.

==== LG K8 ====
LG K8 is a successor to LG K7 and it is similar to the previous model. It was launched in February 2016, and has a different processor, an 8-megapixel rear camera and included autofocus.

==== LG K5 ====
LG K5 is a successor to LG K4 and it is similar to the previous model. It is launched in March 2016, and only it has a 5-inch screen, quad-core CPU and a 5-megapixel camera.

==== LG K3 ====
LG K3 is a predecessor to LG K4. It is launched in August 2016 and it is slightly weaker than the previous model, a VGA front camera and a downgraded CPU.

==== LG K20 plus ====
LG K20 plus (aka. LG K20+, LG K20 (2016)), is a successor to LG K10 and released in December 2016. It has a 2700 mAh battery, upgraded processor and a higher storage and RAM.

==== Comparison ====
Model	Release date	Display	Chipset	Memory		Rear Camera	Front Camera	OS	Battery
Model	Release date	Display	Chipset	ROM	RAM	Rear Camera	Front Camera	OS	Battery
K3	August 2016	4.5" IPS LCD (480 x 854 px)	Mediatek MT6737M - K100; Qualcomm MSM8909 Snapdragon 210 (28 nm) - LS450	8 GB (eMMC 4.5) with microSDHC slot	1 GB	5 MP (720p@30fps)	VGA	Android 6.0 "Marshmallow"	1940 mAh
K4	January 2016	4.5" IPS LCD (480 x 854 px)	Mediatek MT6735M - K120E, K130E; Qualcomm MSM8909 Snapdragon 210 (28 nm) - K121	8 GB (eMMC 4.5) with microSDHC slot	1 GB	5 MP (720p@30fps) with AF	2 MP	Android 5.1.1 "Lollipop"	1940 mAh
K5	March 2016	5.0" IPS LCD (480 x 854 px)	Mediatek MT6582 (28 nm)	8 GB (eMMC 4.5) with microSDHC slot	1 GB	5 MP (1080p@30fps) with AF	2 MP	Android 5.1.1 "Lollipop"	1900 mAh
K7	January 2016	5.0" IPS LCD (480 x 854 px)	Mediatek MT6580M (3G model); Qualcomm MSM8909 Snapdragon 210 (28 nm) (LTE model)	8 or 16 (LTE model only) GB with microSDHC slot	1 (3G model only) or 1.5 GB	5 MP (3G model) or 8 MP (LTE model) (720p@30fps) with AF	5 MP	Android 5.1 "Lollipop"	2125 mAh
K8	February 2016	5.0" IPS LCD (720 x 1280 px)	Mediatek MT6735 (28 nm)	8 or 16 GB with microSDHC slot	1.5 GB	8 MP (1080p@30fps) with AF	5 MP (720p@30fps)	Android 6.0 "Marshmallow", upgradable to Android 7.0 "Nougat"	2125 mAh
K10	January 2016	5.3" IPS LCD (720 x 1280 px)	Qualcomm MSM8916 Snapdragon 410 (28 nm) - 3G model Mediatek MT6753 - LTE model	16 GB (eMMC 4.5) with microSDHC slot	1, 1.5 or 2 GB	8 MP (3G model) or 13 MP (LTE model) (1080p@30fps) with AF	5 MP or 8 MP (1080p@30fps)	Android 5.1.1 "Lollipop" or Android 6.0 "Marshmallow"	2300 mAh
K20+	December 2016	5.3" IPS LCD (720 x 1280 px)	Qualcomm MSM8917 Snapdragon 425 (28 nm)	16 or 32 GB (eMMC 5.1) with microSDXC slot	2 GB	13 MP (1080p@30fps) with AF	5 MP (1080p@30fps)	Android 7.0 "Nougat"	2700 mAh

=== 2017 lineup ===
- LG K3 (2017)
- LG K4 (2017)
- LG K7 (2017)
- LG K8 (2017)
- LG K10 (2017)

=== 2018 lineup ===
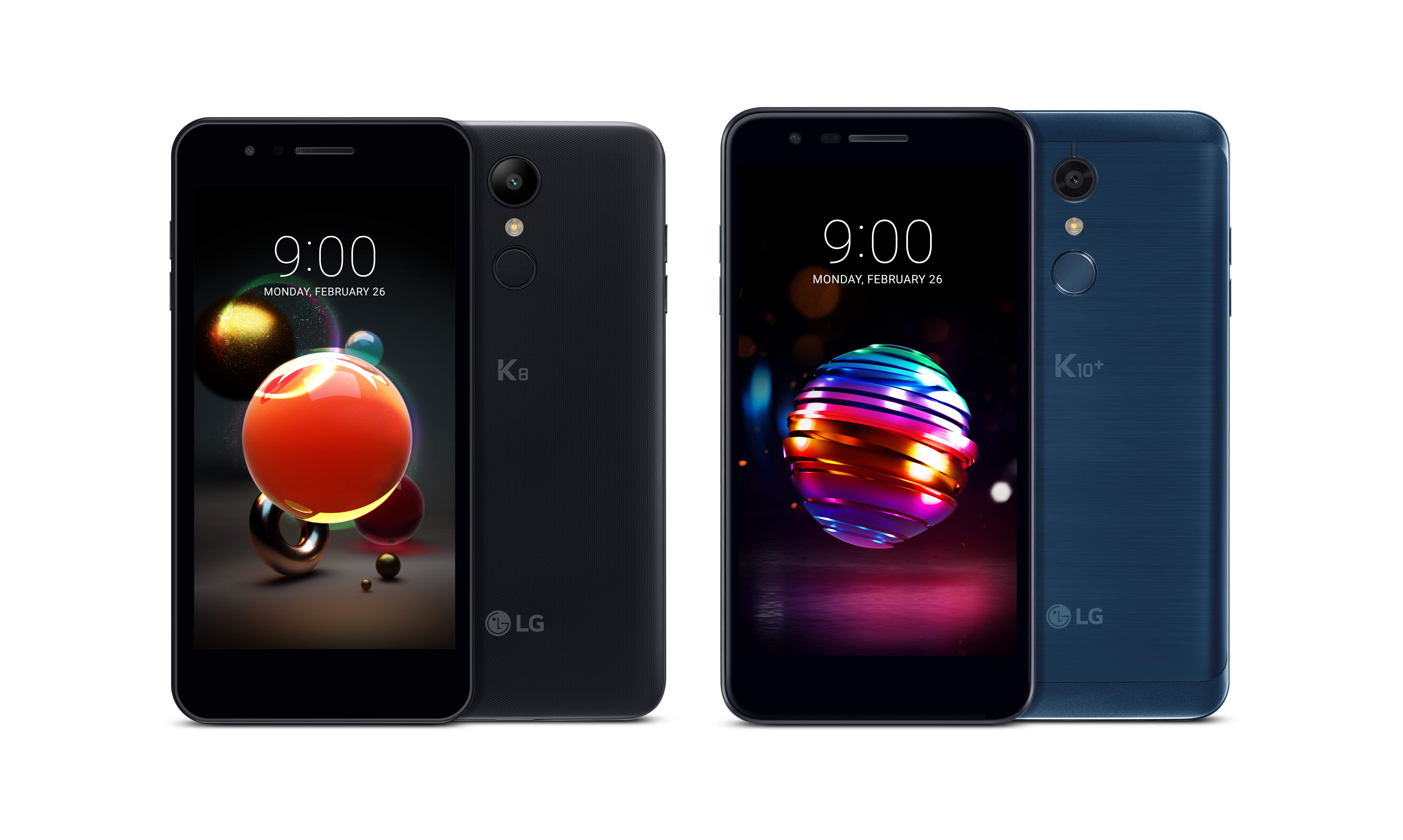
LG K8 (2018) and LG K10+ (2018)

- LG K8 (2018)
- LG K9
- LG K10 (2018)
- LG K11 (2018)
- LG K30

=== 2019 lineup ===
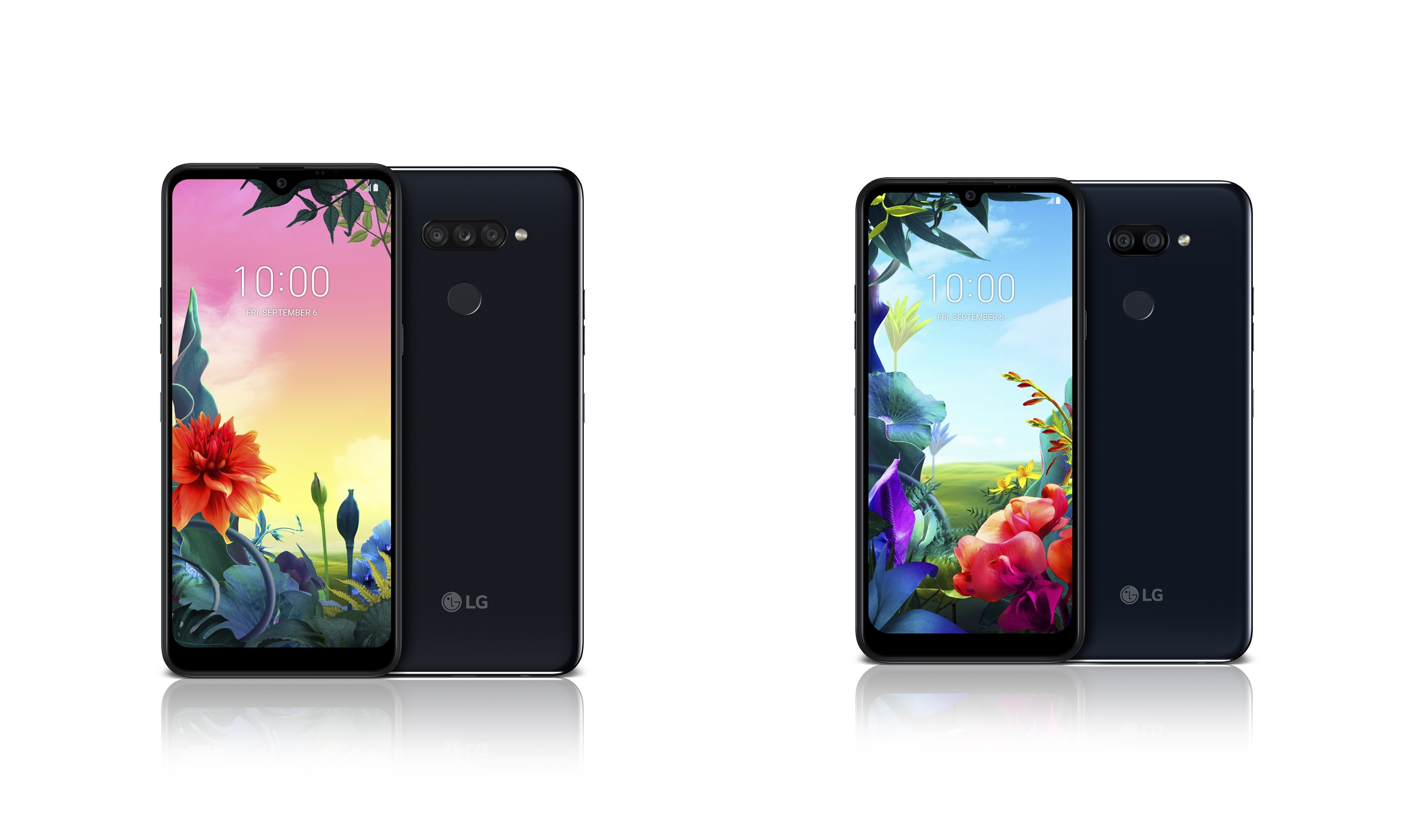
LG K50S and LG K40S

- LG K20 (2019)
- LG K30 (2019)
- LG K40
- LG K40S
- LG K50
- LG K50S

=== 2020 lineup ===
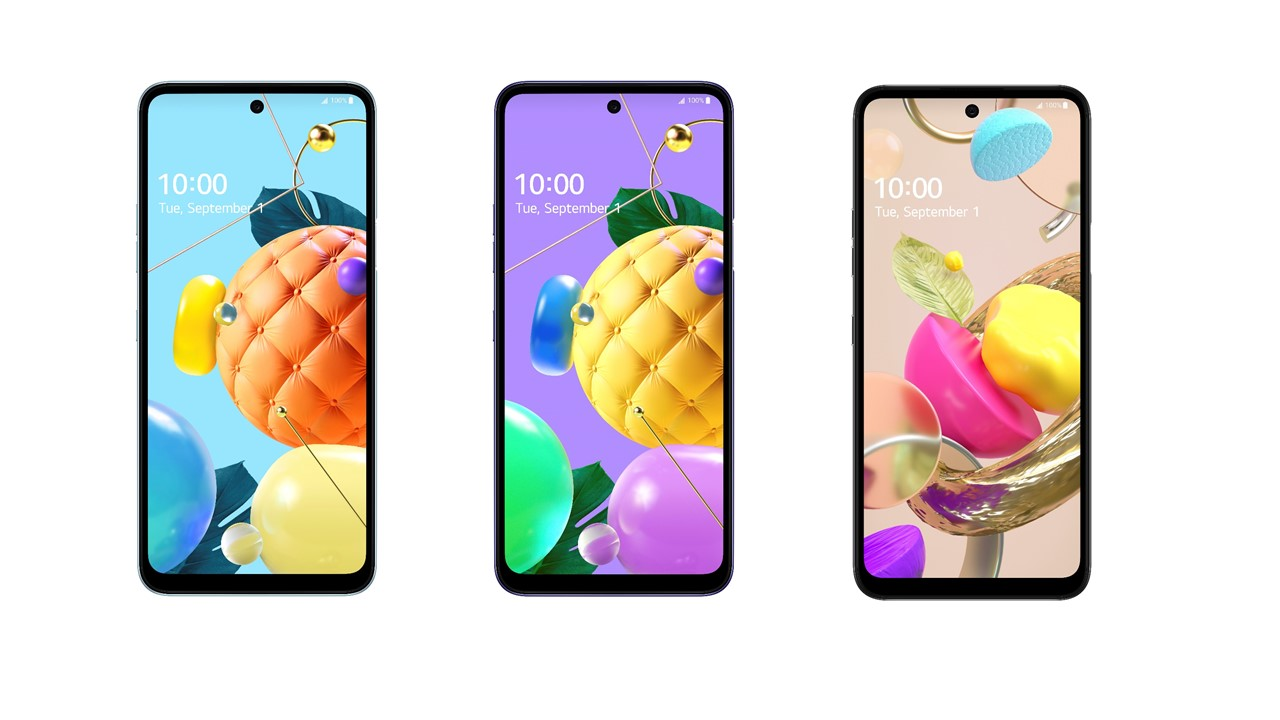
LG K42, LG K52 and LG K62

- LG K22
- LG K31
- LG K41S
- LG K42
- LG K51S
- LG K52
- LG K61
- LG K62
- LG K71
- LG K92 5G

== See also ==
- LG V series
- LG G series
- LG Q series
