= LG K42 =

2020 LG smartphone

LG K42 (LG K52 in Brazil)
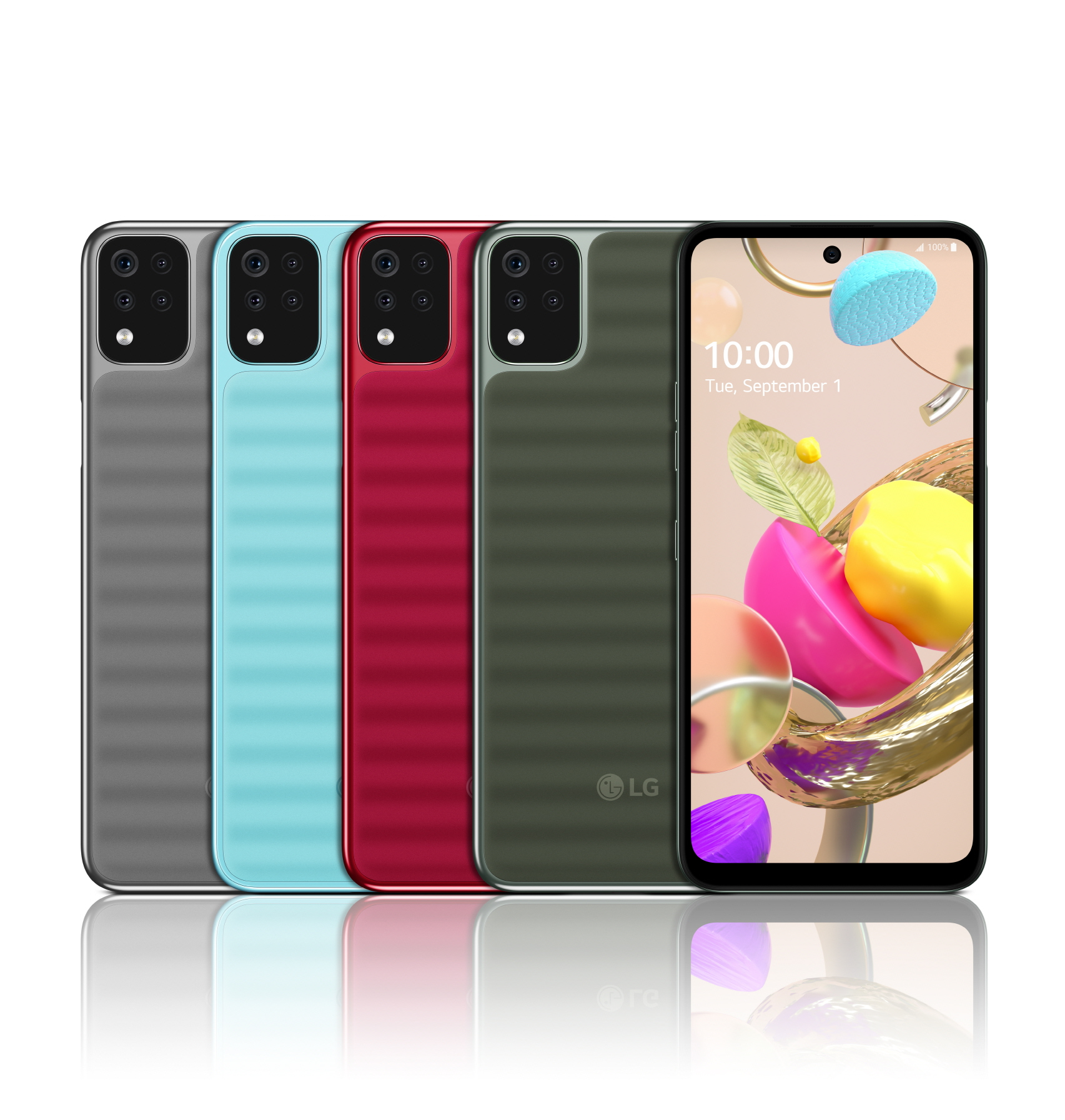
- Brand: LG
- Manufacturer: LG Group
- Type: Smartphone
- Series: LG K
- First released: September 21, 2020
- Availability by region: India - January 22, 2021
- Predecessor: LG K41S
- Related: LG K92; LG K62; LG K22
- Compatible networks: GSM, 3G, 4G (LTE)
- Form factor: Monoblock
- Dimensions: 165 mm H 76.7 mm W 8.4 mm T
- Weight: 182 g (6.42 oz)
- Operating system: Initial: Android 10 + LG UX 9 Current: Android 12 + LG UX
- CPU: MediaTek MT6765 Helio P22 (12 nm), (8x2.3 GHz Cortex-A53)
- GPU: PowerVR GE8320
- Memory: 3 GB
- Storage: 64 GB
- Removable storage: microSDXC
- Battery: Non-removable, Li-po 4000 mAh
- Rear camera: 13 MP, (27 mm, wide, 1/3.1", 1.12 μm) + 5 MP, (f/2.2, ultrawide 1/5.0", 1.12 μm, 115˚), + 2 MP, (f/2.4, depth sensor), + 2 MP, (f/2.4, macro); LED flash, HDR, panorama Video: 1080p@30fps
- Front camera: 8 MP wide Video: 1080p@30fps
- Display: IPS LCD, 6.6", 720 x 1600 (720p), 20:9, 266 ppi
- Connectivity: Wi-Fi 802.11 a/b/g/n/ac (2.4/5 GHz); Bluetooth (5.0, A2DP, LE); USB-C; NFC; GPS
- Data inputs: Multitouch sensor
- Other: Fingerprint (power button-mounted) accelerometer proximity sensor ambient light sensor digital compass

The LG K42 is an Android smartphone developed and manufactured by LG Electronics, which is part of the 6th generation of the LG K series. It was announced and released on September 21, 2020.

In Brazil the model range was shifted and the K42 is called the LG K52. In India, the phone was released on January 22, 2021, with a price of 10,990 rupees.

== Smartphone specifications ==
=== Appearance ===
In the K42, the body consists of glossy plastic, but the back cover additionally has an "ultraviolet coating" with a wave-like pattern. The display occupies 83.1% of the front area, and a droplet-shaped notch is used for the front camera. The fingerprint scanner is simultaneously the power button and is located on the right, with a special button on the left that calls Google Assistant and volume control buttons. At the bottom there is one speaker, a USB-C charging connector and a microphone. The main camera is located on the back panel, at the top left corner it protrudes with a black block, the frame of which is chrome-plated. In the block, in addition to the camera, there is an LED flash. LG K42 is protected by the MIL-STD-810G standard.

The LG K42 was only sold in two colors: Gray and Green.

=== Hardware ===
The phone uses a 12nm MediaTek MT6762 Helio P22 CPU and a PowerVR GE8320 CPU. It has 3 GB of RAM and 64 GB of internal storage. MicroSD cards are supported through a hybrid slot with SIM cards. IPS LCD display at 6.6 inches (105.2 mm) with an aspect ratio of 20:9, and 720p resolution. The phone has a 3.5 mm audio jack. Lithium polymer battery at 4000 mAh, charged with USB-C.

==== Camera ====
A quad-camera is used on the rear panel, consisting of a wide-angle sensor at 13 MP, an ultra-wide-angle at 5 MP f/2.2 and two sensors at 2 MP, one is used as a depth sensor, the other for macro shooting. The front camera has a wide-angle module at 8 MP, records video like the main one, in 1080p 30fps resolution.

=== Software ===
LG K42 was shipped with Android 10 (Queen Cake) and LG UX 9 shell. After LG announced the completion of smartphone production, LG K42 together with K52 received an update to Android 11 in the fourth quarter of 2021.

== See also ==
- Samsung Galaxy A31
