= AMCO Burglar Alarm Company =

Security companies of the United Kingdom

The Alarm Monitoring Company (AMCO).
- Company type: Privately owned (UK)
- Industry: Security systems, Video surveillance, Access control
- Founded: 1995
- Headquarters: Easingwold, UK
- Key people: Les Quigley (Founder, UK); Christopher Quigley (Board Member)

The Alarm Monitoring Company (AMCO) is a UK-based burglar alarm company specialising in monitored alarm systems and alarm monitoring services. The company provides security systems to domestic and business properties, as well as public sector organisations.

== History ==
The company was founded in 1995 by Yorkshire-based Les Quigley as a company specialising in monitored security. Quigley set up AMCO after his experiences running a previous more generalist alarm company called No. 6 Group - named after No.6 Group Bomber Command which was based at its Allerton Castle headquarters. Prior to working in the security industry, Les Quigley was a RAF Cranwell cadet. Most recently Les Quigley's son Christopher Quigley joined the company board. Christopher Quigley is also a co-founder of Team Rubber, and has previously advised U.S. President Barack Obama and the Coalition government.

AMCO specializes in monitored burglar alarms, and is a retailer of immediate audio-response monitored alarm systems (also known as listen in alarm monitoring). In the UK, competitors include ADT, Secom and Chubb.

In 2010, AMCO used the internet to crowd-source ideas from the public on how to create the Ultimate Alarm System. This project -'The Ultimate Alarm Project', created notability for AMCO. Coverage for the project included technology blogs MSN, Mashable and Engadget and over 117,000 views for the project videos on YouTube.

In August 2011, AMCO launched the AMCO Alarm Academy programme to train up new engineers as alarm and CCTV installers and managers. The training programme is both residential and field-based, with students spending the first 4 weeks based in the Alarm Academy Training HQ in Easingwold, and then spending the next 4 weeks shadowing existing AMCO engineers out in the field. The Academy took its first trainees on 15 August 2011.

AMCO is privately owned, with all shares held by the Quigley family. The companies headquarters are in Easingwold, North Yorkshire (UK). AMCO operate alarm engineers across all regions of Great Britain.

== Products and services ==
Monitored alarm systems AMCO provides both standard monitored alarms as well as immediate audio response monitored alarms - also known as listen-in alarm monitoring. Immediate audio response monitoring means that when an alarm is activated, a signal is sent immediately to a remote monitoring station allowing the monitoring station to listen and talk into the property via a speaker/microphone unit (installed in the property). In the case of a registered emergency, the monitoring station can then call the property keyholders and the emergency services (e.g., police in the case of a burglary or the Fire Services in the case of a fire). It is the immediate audio response monitoring which AMCO is most well known for.

Monitored CCTV systems As well as monitored alarms, AMCO also provides Monitored CCTV systems allowing home and business owners to remotely monitor their properties via the internet.

Integrated security systems For properties that require high security, AMCO installs both monitored alarm and CCTV systems to provide intruder detection and surveillance at the same time.

== See also ==
- ADS Group
