= LG K10 (2017) =

Android smartphone model

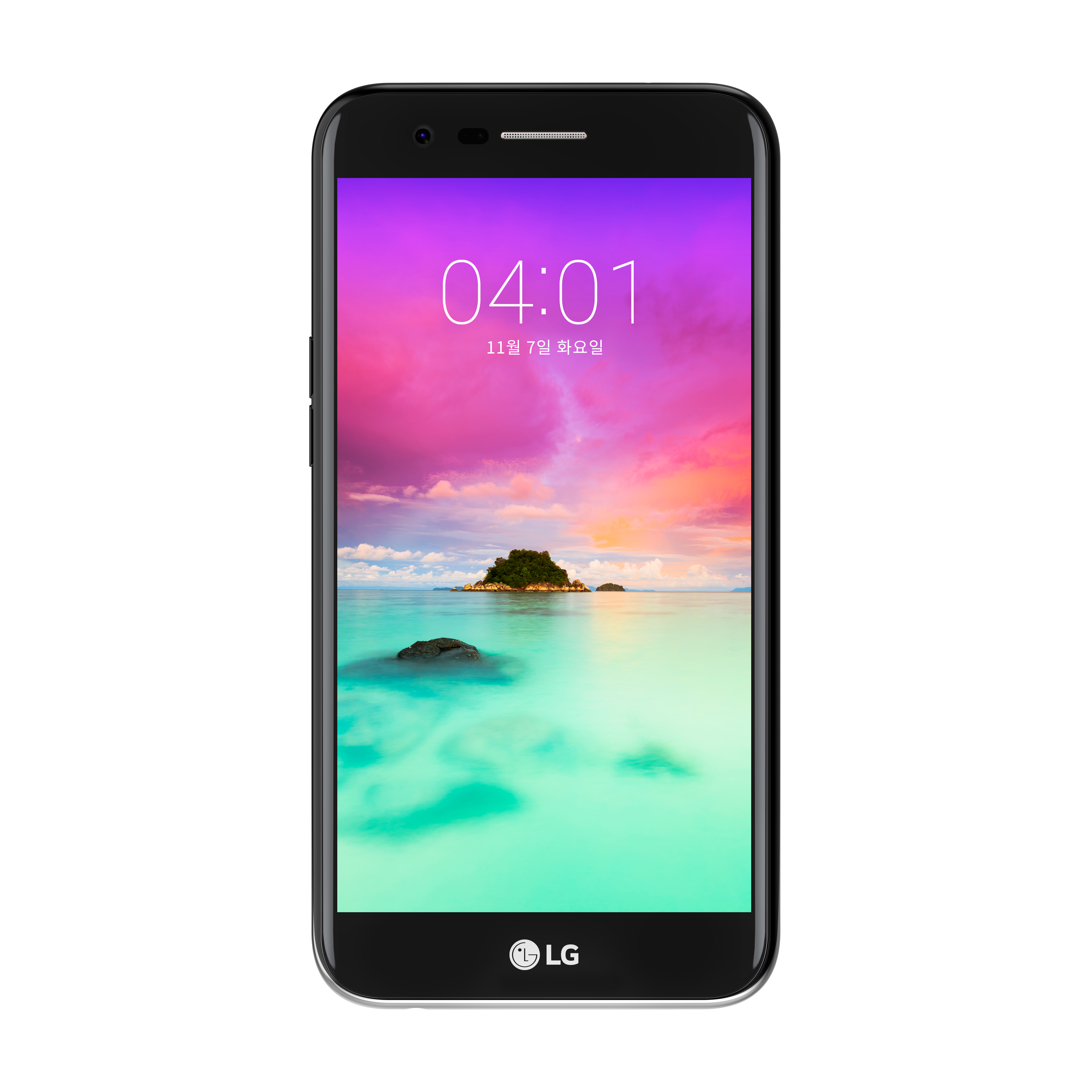
- LG K20 plus (2017) in Black
- Brand: K series
- Manufacturer: LG Electronics
- Type: Smartphone
- First released: February 1, 2017; 9 years ago
- Predecessor: LG K10 (2016)
- Successor: LG K10 (2018)
- Related: LG K10 Pro
- Form factor: Slate
- Dimensions: 148.7 mm × 75.29 mm × 8 mm (5.854 in × 2.964 in × 0.315 in)
- Weight: 142 g (5.0 oz)
- Operating system: Android 7.0 "Nougat" US variant India variant: Android 7.0 Nougat; Current: Android 8.1.0 "Oreo" (India models only)
- System-on-chip: M250x: MediaTek MT6750; M257: Qualcomm Snapdragon 425
- CPU: Mediatek: Octa-core (1 - 1.5 GHz octa-core ARM Cortex-A53); Qualcomm Snapdragon: Quad-core (1.4 GHz Cortex-A53)
- GPU: Mediatek: Mali-T860 MP2; Qualcomm Snapdragon: Adreno 308
- Memory: 2 GB RAM
- Model: M257 (Snapdragon); M250 (Russia); M250AR (Argentina); M250DSN (China and Hong Kong); M250H (Mexico); M250E (Saudi Arabia, UAE, Iran, Europe Dual SIM); M250F (Latin America); M250I (India); M250K (Australia, Philippines, Singapore, Sri Lanka); M250N (Europe Single SIM); M250DS aka K10 NOVO (Brazil, Central America); LGM250DSF-gold (Central America)

LG K10 (2017) (also sold as LG Harmony on Cricket Wireless) is a mid-range Android smartphone developed by LG Electronics and released in February 2017. As the successor to last year's model, the 2017 LG K10 has a number of improvements over its predecessor, such as a fingerprint sensor and a redesigned form factor, along with Android Nougat as the default operating system.

== Features ==
=== Hardware ===
LG K10 (2017) has a redesigned form factor with a rear-mounted power button/fingerprint sensor, though it has a similar 5.3" 720p display with the previous incarnation and different internal hardware variants depending on the region. The M257 version, sold by Cricket Wireless has the Qualcomm Snapdragon 425 system-on-chip with a 1.4 GHz quad-core ARM Cortex-A53 CPU and an Adreno 308 GPU; other models use the MediaTek MT6750 system-on-chip with an octa-core ARM Cortex-A53 CPU comprising a four-core cluster clocked at 1.5 GHz and another four-core cluster clocked at 1.0 GHz and an ARM Mali-T860 MP2 GPU. All models have 2 GB of RAM.

LG K10 (2017) model has 16 GB of internal storage with 9 GB of usable space; the internal storage is expandable up to 2 TB using a microSD card. It has a 2800 mAh battery, compared to the predecessor's 2100 mAh battery. Some models have a fingerprint sensor embedded on the power button at the rear, NFC, and/or dual-SIM.

=== Software ===
LG K10 (2017) runs on Google's Android 7.0 Nougat with LG's user interface. The software supports knock-on gesture, allowing to unlock the phone by tapping on the display. In 2018, it has received Android 8.1.0 Oreo update in India.

The built-in panic button is a key selling point in South Asia, in response to Indian legislation requiring mobile phones sold in the country to have an alarm feature built in following controversy over incidents such as the 2012 Delhi gang rape.
