= BeeSafe =

- Developer: BeeSafe
- Initial release: 2015; 11 years ago
- Operating system: iOS; Android
- Type: Personal safety app
- License: Proprietary
- Website: www.beesafe.me

BeeSafe is a personal safety mobile app launched in 2015 as a Slovak startup. It is a location-based security service that notifies family members and friends in case the user of the app gets in danger. The app has received numerous awards. The app has more than 700 downloads and 250 active logins from more than 60 countries worldwide.

== History ==
BeeSafe was founded on March 20, 2015 by Peter Stražovec and Michal Kačerík. The project was a winner of Žilina’s Startup Weekend 2013 and a StartupAwards.SK 2015 finalist. Later on, the app was released in the Android and iOS marketplace. The whole BeeSafe project was in The Spot booster and incubator in Bratislava for three months.

BeeSafe entered into an agreement with the city of Piešťany in November 2015 to increase the security of its citizen by connecting the mobile app with the police platform. It is the first city that started using the BeeSafe platform. Further on, the application tries to help people in other Slovak cities. The cities can see the users only if they are in danger.

== Awards ==
BeeSafe app received the Via Bona award, it is a winner of a Slovak startup and has other nominations too.
