= LG K22 =

2020 smartphone by LG

- Brand: LG
- Manufacturer: LG Group
- Type: Smartphone
- Series: LG K
- First released: September 12, 2020
- Availability by region: Brazil: September 29, 2020
- Predecessor: LG K20
- Related: LG K92; LG K62; LG K42
- Compatible networks: GSM, 3G, 4G (LTE)
- Form factor: Monoblock
- Dimensions: 155.7 mm H 75.4 mm W 8.4 mm T
- Weight: 169.5 g (6.0 oz)
- Operating system: Initial: Android 10 + LG UX 9 Current: Android 12 + LG UX
- CPU: Qualcomm Snapdragon 215, 4 cores (28 nm), (4x1.3 GHz Cortex-A53)
- GPU: Adreno 308
- Memory: 2/3 GB
- Storage: 32/64 GB
- Removable storage: microSDXC
- Battery: Non-removable, Li-Po 3000 mAh
- Rear camera: 13 MP, (27 mm, wide-angle, 1/5.0", 1.12 μm) + 2 MP, (macro); LED flash, HDR; Video: 1080p@30fps;
- Front camera: 5 MP (f/5.5, 24 mm, wide-angle. 1/5.0", 1.12 μm); Video: 1080p@30fps
- Display: IPS LCD, 6.2", 720 x 1520 (720p), 19:9, 271 ppi
- Connectivity: Wi-Fi 802.11 b/g/n/ Bluetooth (5.0, A2DP, LE); GPS; GLONASS microUSB
- Data inputs: Multi-touch sensor
- Other: Accelerometer proximity sensor light sensor digital compass

The LG K22 is an Android smartphone manufactured by LG Electronics, part of the 6th generation of the LG K series. It was announced on September 12, 2020, and released on September 29 in Brazil.

== Phone characteristics & specifications ==
=== Appearance ===
In the K22, the body is made of non-removable matte plastic. The display occupies 81.7% of the front area, and there is a notch for the front-facing camera. On the right side, there is a power button and volume control buttons, and on the left, there is a special button that activates Google Assistant and a tray for SIM card and memory card. At the bottom, there is a microUSB 2.0 charging port and a microphone. The main camera is located on the rear panel, at the top left corner, in the form of a vertical strip. In the block, in addition to the camera, there is an LED flash. Also, at the bottom of the rear panel, there is a speaker. At the top of the phone, there is a 3.5 mm audio jack.

The LG K22 was sold in 2 colors: Blue (blue) and Titan (titanium gray).

=== Hardware specifications ===
The device was powered by a 28 nanometer Qualcomm Snapdragon 215 central processing unit and an Adreno 308 graphics processing unit. The phone could have either 3 GB of RAM and 64 GB of internal storage, or a version with 2 GB of RAM and 32 GB of internal storage, but in both cases, MicroSD card is supported. The display is IPS LCD 6.2 inches (95.9 mm) with an aspect ratio of 19:9, and 720p resolution. The battery is lithium polymer at 3000 mAh, charged via microUSB.

==== Camera ====
A dual camera is used on the rear panel, consisting of a wide-angle 13 MP sensor and a 2 MP sensor for macro shooting. The front camera has a wide-angle module of 5 MP, and records video like the main camera, in 1080p 30fps resolution.

=== Software ===
The LG K22 was shipped with Android 10 (Queen Cake), but unlike other smartphones of the company, without its own LG UX shell.

== See also ==
- Samsung Galaxy A11
