= LG K10 =

Android smartphone model

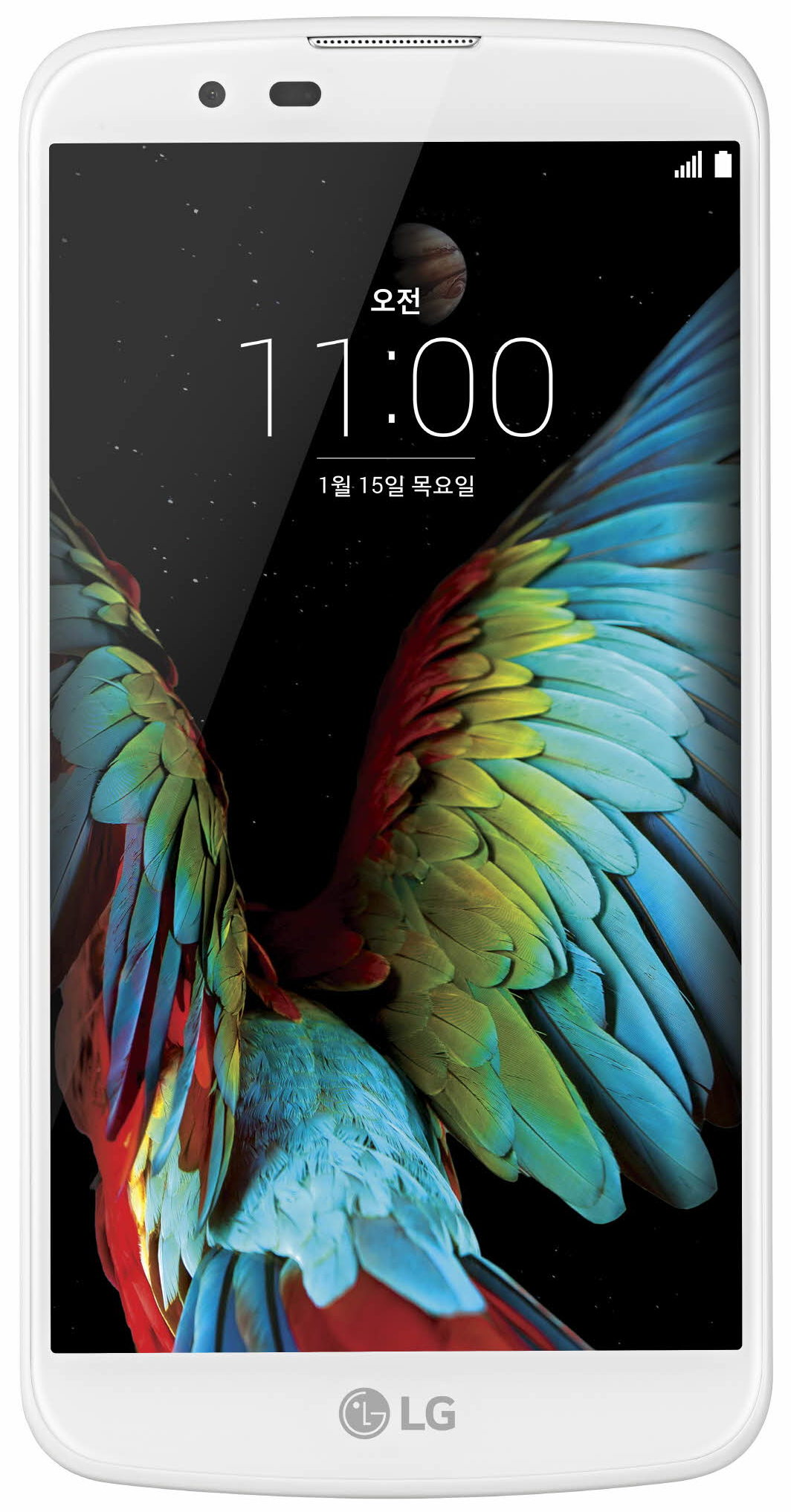
- LG K10 in white.
- Brand: K series
- Manufacturer: LG Electronics
- Type: Smartphone
- First released: January 1, 2016; 10 years ago
- Successor: LG K10 (2017)
- Related: LG K10 Pro
- Form factor: Slate
- Dimensions: 146 mm × 74.8 mm × 8.8 mm (5.75 in × 2.94 in × 0.35 in)
- Weight: 142 g (5.0 oz)
- Operating system: Original: Android 6.0 "Marshmallow"; Android 5.1.1 "Lollipop" (some variants) Current: Android 7.0 Nougat (K425/MS428)
- System-on-chip: K42x/MS428/L61AL/L62VL: Qualcomm Snapdragon 410; K430x: MediaTek MT6753
- CPU: Mediatek: Octa-core (1.3 - 1.5 GHz octa-core ARM Cortex-A53); Qualcomm Snapdragon: Octa-core (1.2 GHz Cortex-A53)
- GPU: Mediatek: Mali T720; Qualcomm Snapdragon: Adreno 306
- Memory: 1 GB RAM (K430DSF); 1.5 GB RAM (K420N, K425, K428SG and MS428); 2 GB RAM (K420DS and K430DSY)
- Model: K420x (Snapdragon); K425 (AT&T); K430x (Mediatek); MS428 (MetroPCS); L61AL/L62VL (Tracfone); (Last letter varies by carrier and international models)

The LG K10 (also sold as the LG Premier on TracFone) is a mid-range Android smartphone developed by LG Electronics and released in 2016. It is considered one of the top 10 budget phones of 2016 by Consumer Electronics Show. A successor to the phone of the same name, with a fingerprint sensor and a built-in panic alarm for South Asian regions, was released the following year.

Several variants of the phone were released, with different processors, RAM capacity, cameras, dual SIM, NFC and 4G LTE support depending on the country. North American and certain Eurasian variants of the K10 (K420DS, K420N, K425, K428SG, L61AL, L62VL and MS428) run on a Qualcomm Snapdragon 410, while the K430DS, K430DSF, K430DSY and the Brazilian-market K430TV models use a MediaTek MT6753.

== Features ==
=== Hardware ===
The K10 has a 5.3-inch (130 mm) IPS LCD touchscreen, and comes in two distinct variations that differ primarily in the internal hardware. The K42x version, sold by T-Mobile, AT&T and MetroPCS in the United States, in Europe as the K420N and in India as the K420DS, has Qualcomm's Snapdragon 410 system-on-chip; LG has also released the K430x variant of the phone in select markets—while sharing the same form factor as the K42x models, the K430 model uses MediaTek's MT6753 system-on-chip containing a 1.3 - 1.5 GHz octa-core ARM Cortex-A53, and a Mali-T720 GPU.

The K10 has a maximum of 2 GB RAM, depending on the model—the K430DSF only comes with 1 GB; the K420N and North American K425, K428SG and MS428 variants come with 1.5 GB and the K420DS and K430DSY has 2 GB of RAM.

All variants come with either 8 or 16 GB of onboard storage, depending on the variant. In addition to the internal storage, the K10's storage capacity can be expanded using a microSDXC card. Depending on the country, the K10 may come with 4G LTE support—the L62VL variant sold by Tracfone as the LG Premier LTE comes with support for CDMA2000 and 4G LTE, near-field communication, which is unavailable on the K430x models, a 13 MP rear-facing camera and a 5 MP front-facing camera for video calls; North American models only come with an 8 MP camera in lieu of the 13 MP sensor. In addition, the Brazilian-market K430TV comes with a built-in ISDB-T receiver.

=== Software ===
The K10 runs on either Android 5.1.1 "Lollipop" or Android 6.0.1 "Marshmallow" depending on the model, along with LG's proprietary user interface. Among other things, the phone's operating system supports knock-on gestures allowing the user to unlock the device by tapping on the display in a certain manner, and support for smart covers where part of the screen is visible to display notifications or incoming calls which the user can swipe up or down to answer or reject it, respectively.

== Reception ==
Reception for the K10 has been mixed to positive upon release, with most reviewers noting its performance and build quality but criticizing the price, camera quality and lack of USB OTG support. Ajay Kumar of PC Magazine gave the MetroPCS variant of the K10 a mixed review, praising the device's build and price, but noted the camera quality along with the antiquated processor used which hampered performance in system-intensive games like Grand Theft Auto: San Andreas. In a similarly mixed review, Ashish Mohta of TechPP also praised the K10's performance, yet criticized the camera, its price compared to other mid-range devices, and lack of quick charging support. Florian Wimmer of the German-language edition of Notebook Check stated that the K10 wants to "bring style to the lower middle-class", but was also critical of the phone's camera and display, describing it as "standing in the way".
