= Life Alert Emergency Response =

American company providing personal emergency response services

Life Alert Emergency Response, Inc.
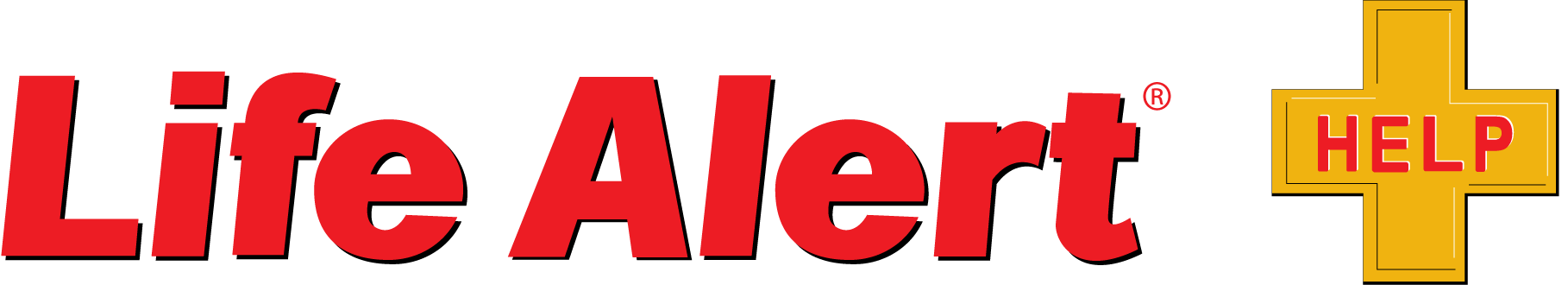
- Type: Personal emergency response services
- Founded: 1987; 39 years ago
- Founders: Isaac Shepher, Zohar Loshitzer, and Arik Amir
- Headquarters: Encino, California
- Products: Micro Voice Pendant System; Help Button; On-the-Go + GPS
- Website: www.lifealert.com www.lifealert.net www.youtube.com/@LifeAlertOfficial

Life Alert Emergency Response, Inc., known as Life Alert, is a nationwide American personal emergency response systems provider, with headquarters in Encino, California, US, which provides services that help elderly people contact emergency services using medical alert, panic button and on-the-go GPS devices. The company was founded in 1987. The company's system offers a variety of medical alert devices including home-based systems as well as mobile systems with GPS that can be used outside of home. The small wireless help button is worn by the user at all times, including at night or while bathing. Former Surgeon General C. Everett Koop appeared in commercials for Life Alert starting in 1992, stating that he used one. He remained a spokesman for the company until his death in 2013.

== Service ==
Life Alert offers solutions for in-home protection and on-the-go safety. The devices include a choice of landline or cellular-based main base unit with an emergency call button, a micro voice pendant that has a two-way speaker, a waterproof shower button and a mobile help pendant with GPS. Pressing a button on the pendant contacts a Life Alert call center, and a Life Alert dispatcher then contacts appropriate authorities, family, neighbors and other emergency contacts.

== Lawsuits ==
In September 1991, nine district attorneys sued Life Alert for high pressure sales tactics and misleading consumers about how the Life Alert system sends calls to emergency service providers.

The lawsuit said that Life Alert had falsely claimed that its system had special access 911, that local emergency agencies react faster to Life Alert calls compared to other 911 calls, and that Life Alert customers receive preferential treatment from public emergency service providers. District attorneys said that Life Alert's sales representatives had fabricated fictional stories about victims of crime in order to instill fear and anxiety in people. Life Alert's sales training manual encouraged sales representatives to say that people were in danger without the system and to "go for the emotional sale, not a logical sale." Life Alert's sales representatives would initially quote an inflated price and then quoted a lower price in order to make the person think they were receiving a large discount. Prosecutors said that Life Alert sold systems for $1,700 to $5,000 that could be rented from local hospitals for $25 per month, and that the systems did little more than relaying calls to 911 operators who then called for emergency service providers.

Aside from the grey-haired fallen lady, another situation illustrated in ads involved "a man suffers a heart attack, alone in his garden." The ads are not being restricted: it is the "deceptive sales pitches" that are the focus of a court injunction. In response to the lawsuit, a representative said that Life Alert is a burglar-alarm company that offers an additional communication device. The company later claimed in court that, while there may have been some isolated incidents of exaggerations by salespeople, there was no evidence of a pattern of such practice by the company.

- 1992: the Arizona Attorney General filed a lawsuit against Life Alert for consumer fraud. Life Alert agreed to stop soliciting business in Arizona, although it can continue to provide service to existing customers in Arizona.
- 1993: a court judgment required Life Alert to stop making the false claims, and it required Life Alert to pay $700,000 to a victim restitution fund, $350,000 in civil penalties, and $300,000 in prosecution costs.

== Trademarks ==
The phrase "I've fallen and I can't get up" was originally used in 1987 television commercials by Life Alert, and then in 1989 by LifeCall that trademarked it in September 1992 before going out of business in 1993. After LifeCall's trademark expired, a similar phrase, "Help, I've fallen and I can't get up!", was registered by Life Alert, in October 2002. The classic commercial featuring this slogan was ranked number one by USA Today in its 2007 list of the most memorable TV commercials from the past 25 years.

=== Slogan's history ===
"I've fallen, and I can't get up!" is a catchphrase of the late 1980s and early 1990s popular culture based upon a line from a United States-based television commercial. This line was spoken by actress Dorothy McHugh in a television commercial for a medical alarm and protection company called LifeCall.

The motivation behind the systems is that subscribers, mostly seniors as well as disabled people, would receive a pendant which, when activated, would allow the user to speak into an audio receiving device and talk directly with a dispatch service, without the need to reach a telephone. The service was designed to appeal particularly to seniors who lived alone and who might experience a medical emergency, such as a fall, which would leave them alert but immobile and unable to reach the telephone.

In 1989, LifeCall began running commercials that contained a scene wherein an elderly woman, identified by a dispatcher as "Mrs. Fletcher", uses the medical alert pendant after having fallen in the bathroom. After falling, Mrs. Fletcher speaks the phrase "I've fallen, and I can't get up!", after which the dispatcher informs her that he is sending help.

Edith Fore (née Edith Americus DeVirgilis; 1916–1997) portrayed Mrs. Fletcher. Although a stuntperson performed the fall itself, Fore said that she created the "I've fallen" line while discussing the accident with LifeCall.

==== Legacy coverage ====
By 1990, the Phoenix New Times reported that "From coast to coast, from playground to barroom, an enfeebled whine rings out across the land. All together now: 'I've fallen . . . and I can't get up!'" The catchphrase appeared on t-shirts, novelty records, and in standup comedy. In 1992, a sample of the catchphrase was featured in parody artist "Weird Al" Yankovic's song "I Can't Watch This" (a parody of M.C. Hammer's "U Can't Touch This"). The phrase was parodied in several television shows including The Golden Girls, Family Matters, Roseanne, and The Fresh Prince of Bel-Air. In 1993, Gary Larson drew a Far Side cartoon featuring the "I've fallen, and I can't get up" building. A sample of the phrase was also featured in a track used only in the Japanese Sega Saturn version of Fighting Vipers when the player is in the training stage.

==== Slogan trademark history ====
According to the United States Patent and Trademark Office, after first applying in October 1990, LifeCall registered the phrase "I've fallen, and I can't get up" as a trademark in September 1992 until its status was cancelled in 1999 (LifeCall went out of business in 1993). In October 2002, the phrase "Help! I've fallen, and I can't get up!" became a registered trademark of Life Alert Emergency Response, Inc. The registration expired in May 2013. A new registration was granted in May 2014. In June 2007, the phrase "I've fallen, and I can't get up!" also became a registered trademark of Life Alert. Both phrases are currently used on their website as well as in their commercials.

== In popular culture ==
- In the 12th episode of the sixth season of the TV series Better Call Saul, an elderly woman named Marion (Carol Burnett) uses her Life Alert pendant to report to the police that Saul Goodman (Bob Odenkirk) is in her home, after which he flees.

== Founders and notable employees ==
- Founders (1987): Isaac Shepher, Zohar Loshitzer, and Arik Amir.
- Notable employee (35 years): Mark Turenshine (1944–2016), American-Israeli basketball player

== See also ==
- Panic button
