= Medical Guardian =

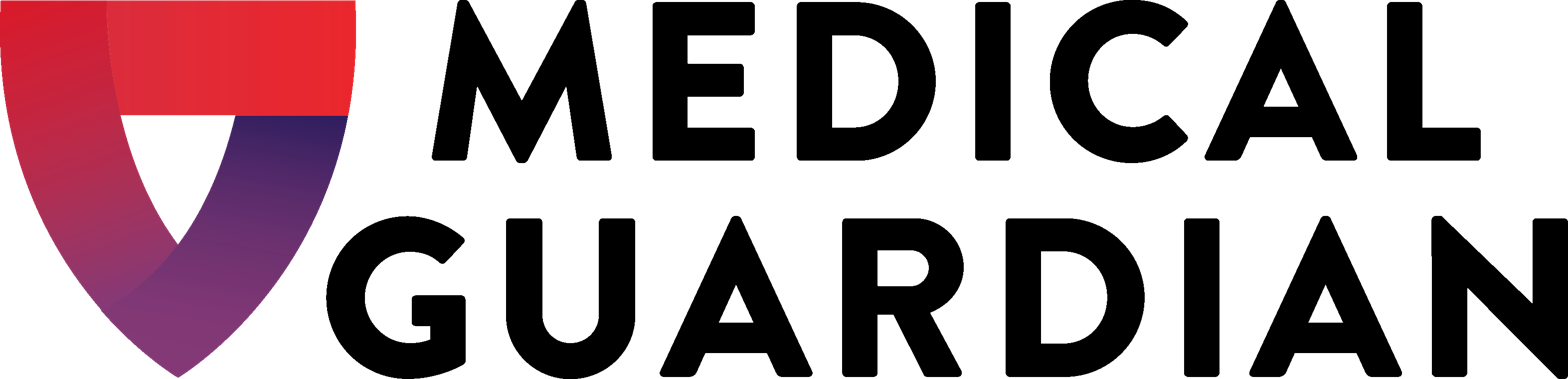
- Company type: Private
- Founded: 2005; 21 years ago in Philadelphia, Pennsylvania
- Founder: Geoff Gross
- Headquarters: Philadelphia, Pennsylvania
- Website: medicalguardian.com

Medical Guardian is an American personal emergency response systems (PERS) provider headquartered in Philadelphia, Pennsylvania. The company has appeared in Inc. Magazine's list of 5000 fastest-growing U.S. companies nine years in a row from 2013 to 2021.

== History ==
Medical Guardian was founded by Geoff Gross in 2005. Initially, he ran the company out of his Philadelphia, Pennsylvania apartment. He made the first couple thousand sales by himself, directly marketing to seniors by phone.

By April 2013, the company had grown to 50 employees and moved to a new headquarters and call center in Center City, the Downtown Philadelphia area.

In May 2014, the company reached a deal with the Cambria County to supply the local agency with rental monitoring equipment which the county in turn provided to its senior citizens. By the end of 2014, the company reported $14.4 million of revenue. This was an increase from the $10.9 million revenue it reported the previous year.

As of 2015, the company does not manufacture its products but rents medical alarm equipment produced by other companies and offers subscriptions to third-party monitoring services. The equipment was produced by three different manufacturers.

In January 2015, Florence Henderson became the spokeswoman for the company, appearing in commercials for Medical Guardian. She would also appear in company videos and its website. According to Gross, Henderson was herself a client living independently at 81-years old.

By 2016, the company had also grown to 125 employees. Accordion to Gross, about sixty percent of the company is under the age of thirty-five.

It had also appeared in the Inc. Magazine's list of 5000 fastest-growing companies four years in a row, beginning in 2013 when it first appeared, reporting a 415% increase in revenue. The company has received SmartCEO's Future 50 Awards three years in a row in 2015 to 2017. Since then, Medical Guardian has been listed as an Inc 5000 company, which means the company has spent a total of nine years on the list

Near the end of 2016, the company introduced a family-oriented medical alert system. The product was developed in conjunction with Essence Group, an Israeli technology company. The system monitors the client's activities by use of wireless devices, motion sensors and cell phone service connected devices, sending regular updates to their family members. However, it does not offer “smoke or carbon monoxide monitoring” as is available in some of the other medical alert systems.

In October 2021, Medical Guardian acquired MedScope American Corporation, a developer and provider of personal emergency response devices to healthcare organizations and private insurance carriers. Water Street Healthcare Partners was part of the team that invested $100 million to help the Medical Guardian grow. With the MedScope acquisition and company growth, Medical Guardian grew to 310 employees. The company reached 300,000 customers, with Ruth Bader Ginsburg, Associate Justice of the Supreme Court of the United States, among the ranks prior to her death in 2020.

In May 2024, Medical Guardian acquired MobileHelp, a provider of real-time personal emergency response devices, medical monitoring, location tracking and other solutions to help older patients live independently and healthily. MobileHelp's B2B healthcare division, Clear Arch Health, was also acquired by Medical Guardian in a move to integrate MobileHelp's patented technology into its flagship service, MGEngage360, and knock out the competition.
