= I've fallen, and I can't get up! =

Catchphrase

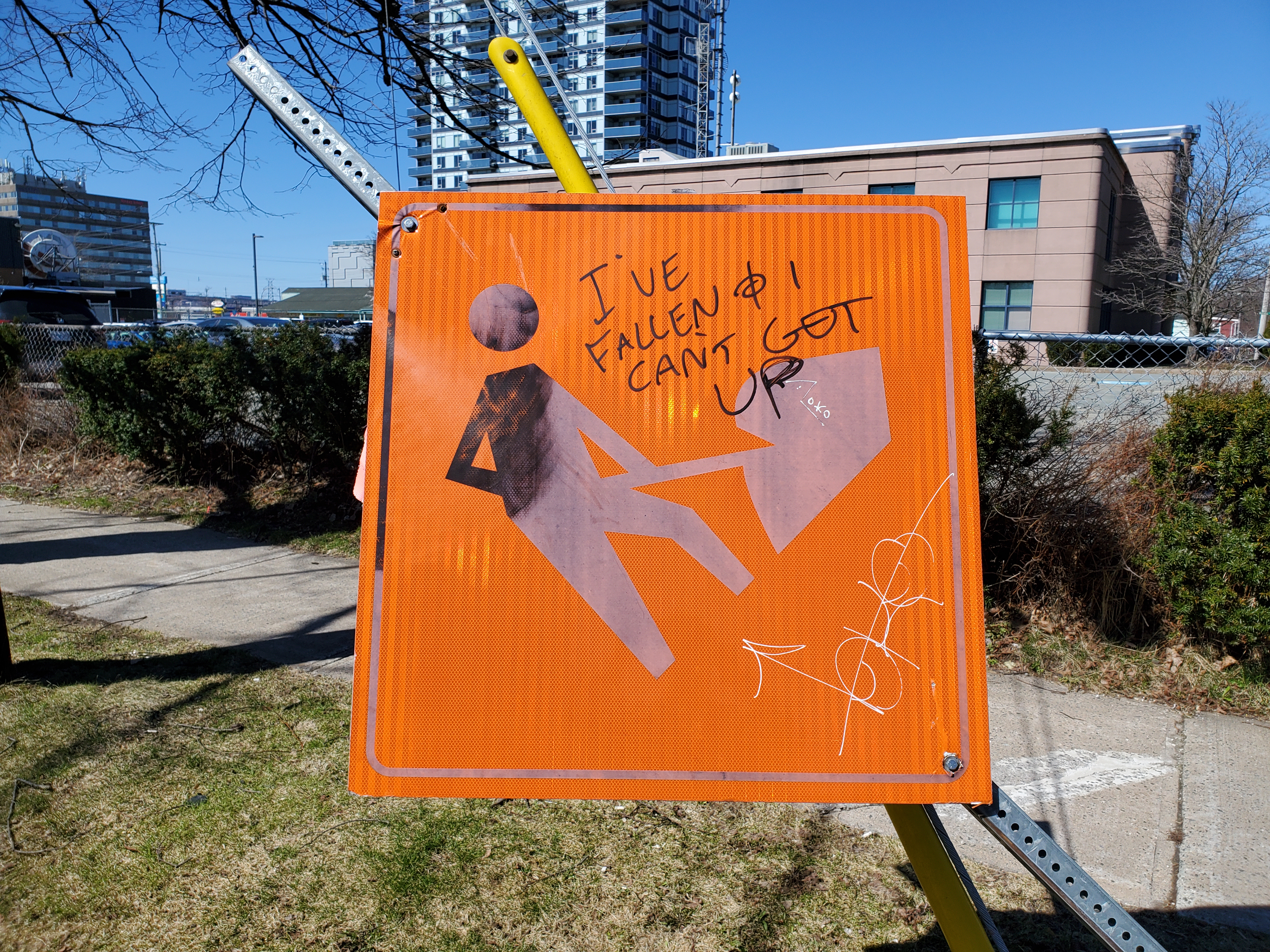
The catchphrase written with a marker on a fallen road work sign in Halifax, Canada

"I've fallen, and I can't get up!" is a line spoken in television commercials for LifeCall, a now defunct medical alarm and protection company.

== Origins ==
The line was spoken by actress Dorothy McHugh in a 1987 LifeCall television commercial. LifeCall subscribers, mostly seniors and disabled people, would receive a pendant which, when activated, would allow the user to speak into an audio receiving device and talk directly with a dispatch service, without the need to reach a telephone. The service was designed to appeal particularly to seniors who lived alone and who might experience a medical emergency, such as a fall, which would leave them alert but immobile and unable to reach a telephone.

In 1989, LifeCall began running commercials that contained a scene wherein an elderly woman, identified by a dispatcher as "Mrs. Fletcher", uses the medical alert pendant after having fallen in the bathroom. After falling, Mrs. Fletcher speaks the phrase "I've fallen, and I can't get up!", after which the dispatcher informs her that he is sending help. Edith Fore (née Edith Americus DeVirgilis; 1916–1997) portrayed Mrs. Fletcher, with a stuntperson performing the fall itself.

The origins of the line are in dispute. Fore claimed in a 1990 interview to have invented the "I've fallen" line herself during a script conference; whereas competitor Life Alert claimed to have originated the line in a 1985 commercial, where it was delivered by a male actor.

== Legacy ==
By 1990, the Phoenix New Times reported that "From coast to coast, from playground to barroom, an enfeebled whine rings out across the land. All together now: 'I've fallen . . . and I can't get up!'" The catchphrase appeared on t-shirts, novelty records, and in standup comedy. Samples have been used in songs such as "I Can't Watch This" in 1992 by "Weird Al" Yankovic, and "Silent Inferno" by the Flower Kings on the 2002 album Unfold the Future. The phrase was parodied in several television shows including Family Matters which became one of Steve Urkel's catchphrases, The Golden Girls, Roseanne and The Fresh Prince of Bel-Air.

== Trademark ==
According to the United States Patent and Trademark Office, after first applying in October 1990, LifeCall registered the phrase "I've fallen, and I can't get up" as a trademark in September 1992 until its status was cancelled in 1999 (LifeCall went out of business in 1993). In October 2002, the similar phrase "Help! I've fallen, and I can't get up!" became a registered trademark of Life Alert Emergency Response, Inc. The registration was cancelled in May 2013. A new registration was granted in May 2014. Life Alert had filed for the phrase "Help, I've fallen & can't get up!" in March 2001, but the application was abandoned in November 2001. In June 2007, the phrase "I've fallen, and I can't get up!" also became a registered trademark of Life Alert. Both phrases are currently used on their website as well as in their commercials.

== See also ==
- Medical alarm
