= LG Stylo 5 =

2019 smartphone model

- Brand: LG
- Manufacturer: LG Electronics
- Type: Smartphone
- Series: LG Stylo
- First released: June 30, 2019 (Cricket and Boost Mobile); July 29, 2019 (Verizon Wireless); August 27, 2019 (Verizon Wireless)
- Discontinued: Yes
- Predecessor: LG Stylo 4
- Successor: LG Stylo 6
- Compatible networks: GSM, HSPA, LTE
- Form factor: Slate
- Colors: Blonde Rose, Platinum Gray
- Dimensions: 160 mm × 77.7 mm × 8.4 mm (6.30 in × 3.06 in × 0.33 in)
- Weight: 179 g (6.3 oz)
- Operating system: Android 9.0 (Pie), upgradable to Android 10
- System-on-chip: Qualcomm SDM450 Snapdragon 450 (14 nm)
- CPU: Octa-core 1.8 GHz Cortex-A53
- GPU: Adreno 506
- Memory: 3 GB RAM
- Storage: 32 GB eMMC 5.1
- Removable storage: microSDXC (dedicated slot)
- SIM: Nano-SIM
- Battery: Non-removable Li-Ion 3500 mAh
- Rear camera: 13 MP, PDAF; LED flash, panorama, HDR
- Front camera: 5 MP
- Display: 6.2 in (157 mm) IPS LCD; 1080 x 2160 pixels, 18:9 ratio (~390 ppi density)
- Data inputs: Fingerprint (rear-mounted), accelerometer, proximity sensor
- Model: LM-Q720
- Other: Stylus pen

The LG Stylo 5 is an entry-level Android smartphone manufactured, designed, and marketed by LG Electronics, which features a stylo pen and as part of the LG Stylo series. Unveiled on June 30, 2019, the Stylo 5 was only available for Cricket and Boost models in the United States.

On July 29, 2019, the Stylo 5 was released by T-Mobile and on August 27 for the Verizon Wireless carrier.

== Specifications ==
=== Hardware and performance ===
The Stylo 5 houses a Snapdragon 450 system-on-chip integrated with a 1.8 GHz Cortex-A53 octa-core. It also uses the Adreno 506 graphics processor. The Stylo 5 was only available at 3GB RAM +32GB internal storage configuration

=== Display, battery and camera ===
In the front, the Stylo 5 is equipped by an IPS LCD display, sizing at 6.2 inches and a resolution of 1080 × 2160 (HD+, 18:9 ratio). Inside, it has a li-ion battery with a capacity of 3,500 mAh, which is not removable.

In the rear, the Stylo 5 has its single 13-megapixel camera with PDAF, LED flash, panorama, and HDR, and the front facing camera has a resolution of 5-megapixels. Both cameras record up to 1080p @ 30fps.

=== Software ===
The Stylo 5 was initially launched with Android 9.0 (Pie). It also as a built-in Screen-off Memo, Pop Lens, and Draw Chat via stylus pen.

==== Android 10 ====
The T-Mobile carrier for the Stylo 5 was updated to Android 10 with minor security, system and bug fixes in June 2020.

== Reception ==
Despite being classified as an entry level, it was termed as the "Galaxy Note alternative" for budget consumers. Android Police reviewer Corbin Davenport responded positive for its stylus, design, and headphone jack, but it was criticized for its average camera and software.
