= Team Rubber =

British companies

- Company type: digital agency/online marketing/e-democracy
- Industry: digital media/online marketing e-democracy
- Founded: 2001
- Headquarters: Bristol, England

Team Rubber is an independently owned group of creative companies founded in Bristol in 2001 by three Bristol University students, Chris Quigley, Andrew Parkhouse and Matt Golding. The Team Rubber Group comprises three creative companies: Rubberductions, Delib and Rubber Republic. A fourth subsidiary, the Viral Ad Network, was acquired by Sharethrough in October 2014. Team Rubber was ranked number 41 in top 100 South West creative companies in 2009 and number 56 in 2010. It currently has offices in Bristol and London.

== Delib ==
Delib is digital democracy company. In 2009 it collaborated with the London School of Economics to design an argument guide called aMap. In 2010 it created the crowdsourcing site Your Freedom for the British government, with ideas from it included in the Protection of Freedoms Bill 2011.

Delib provides the public consultation tool Citizen Space, described as a powerful tool built specifically for external consultations by government organisations.

Delib provides the deliberative prioritisation tool Simulator, which has been used for local authority budget public consultation.

Delib operates the Citizen Space Aggregator, listing many consultation exercises from public bodies in Australia, New Zealand, the UK and European nations.

== Rubber Republic ==
Rubber Republic is a brand film studio which has worked with the BBC, Mercedes-Benz, Audi, Bodyform, Fiat, Hackett and Gillette. The company has won over 25 international awards for their work including a Cannes Gold Cyber Lion & Webby award.

== Viral Ad Network ==
The Viral Ad Network was an online video advertising network launched in 2007 and relaunched in 2009, designed to serve more than 14 million ads a month on a cost per engagement basis. It received funding from government’s Knowledge Transfer Partnerships (KTP) in conjunction with the University of the West of England. It was acquired by Sharethrough in 2014.

== Rubberductions ==
Rubberductions is a film company, producing original comedy, drama, music and commercial films. It won the Cannes 24hr Film Challenge in 2006.
