= LG K10 (2018) =

Android smartphone model

The 2018 LG K10 is a mid-range Android phone developed and manufactured by LG Electronics and was announced on Mobile World Congress in February 2018, alongside the 2018 LG K8. The phone was released in April 2018. Notable changes compared to the predecessor include a redesigned form factor and some hardware upgrades. The model will be sold with three variants, namely the base LG K10, the low-end LG K10α (K10 Alpha) and the high-end LG K10+.

== Features ==
=== Hardware ===
The 2018 model sports a metal design, compared to the predecessor. Similar to the previous model, it has the same processor and 720p screen.

The LG K10α has the downgraded camera, with 8 MP rear and 5 MP front cameras, compared to K10 and K10's 13 MP rear and 8 MP or 5 MP front camera. They can record 1080p at 30fps of video. The LG K10+'s storage and RAM was increased to 32 GB and 3 GB respectively, compared to LG K10 and K10α's 16 GB of storage and 2 GB RAM. They can be expandable of up to 400 GB of microSD card. The battery of 2018 models has upgraded to 3000 mAh, compared to the predecessor's 2800 mAh battery.

=== Price ===
It is 100 euros in Iran.
