= Alarm monitoring center =

An alarm monitoring center, central monitoring station (also known as "CMS" or wholesale central station), or alarm receiving center (also known as ARC) is a company that provides services to monitor burglar, fire, residential and medical alarm systems. The Central Monitoring Station may also provide watchman and supervisory services.

"It functions as a support system for critical event management devices, such as: security alarm panels, gas and temperature gauges, PERS devices, crash detection devices, integrated video systems, and even mobile applications." When a genuine alert is confirmed, the monitoring team may immediately contact the relevant emergency service.

Central monitoring stations use special telephone and mobile lines, radio channels, computers, software and trained staff to monitor their customers' security systems and call the appropriate authorities in the event an alarm signal is received. Typically, there is a monthly fee for services rendered. Because quality and experience can vary greatly among alarm companies, prospective customers are well advised to do their own research before making a final choice. Not all alarm companies monitor the systems they install and may outsource these services to another company.

Some facilities are certified by independent agencies. In the US, Underwriters Laboratories (UL) is a leader in inspection and certification of central-stations. UL Standard 827 must be adhered to in order to maintain a UL issued central-station listing. UL conducts annual audits of these listed facilities to ensure compliance.

"UL listed" companies typically offer higher levels of service and reliability because they are mandated to follow certain regulations. Higher levels of service also include range of services, and a separation from companies with conflicts of interest who may be owned or operated by entities that in fact compete with the central station's customers.

If the UL listed central station is "automated", the computers and software must meet special requirements, processing and storing very large amounts of data and integration with many different alarm protocols.

In addition, many central monitoring stations seek to become FM approved in order to demonstrate additional levels of regulation compliance and interest for customer safety.

Incoming signals are processed by digital alarm receivers; these convert the incoming event packets to serial or TCP packets which are then analysed by the Central Station software. Event packets can be communicated over any transmission medium: PSTN, GSM, radio, direct line, Ethernet, GPRS, etc.

== Central Station Services ==
An Alarm Monitoring Center can offer a handful of services, but the most common markets that use central station services are:

- Security and fire detection system installers
- Personal Emergency Response System (PERS) retailers
- Devices connected to the Internet of Things.
- Crash Detection Devices
- Integrated Security Cameras
- Lone Workers
- Environmental Monitoring (flood, gas, temperature)

== Worldwide ==
=== United Kingdom ===
In the United Kingdom, Alarm Receiving Centres (ARCs) operate within one of the world's most highly regulated monitoring environments. To deliver police response services to monitored intruder and hold-up alarm systems, ARCs, installers, and alarm signalling providers must comply with a framework of nationally recognised standards, certification schemes, and police requirements.

ARCs are independently inspected and certificated by UKAS-accredited certification bodies, such as the National Security Inspectorate (NSI) and SSAIB. Facilities are required to demonstrate compliance with recognised standards, including BS 5979, which specifies the operational, technical, staffing, resilience, and security requirements for alarm receiving centres. Larger monitoring facilities may alternatively operate to BS EN 50518, the European Standard for monitoring and alarm receiving centres.

For a monitored intruder or hold-up alarm system to qualify for a police response, the system must be installed and maintained by an approved security company and meet the requirements of the National Police Chiefs' Council (NPCC) Security Systems Policy. The protected premises must also be issued with a unique Police Unique Reference Number (URN), which enables the ARC to request an agreed police response when a confirmed alarm activation occurs.

To obtain and retain a URN, systems must be installed, maintained, and monitored in accordance with relevant British and European Standards by organisations holding recognised third-party certification. Police response is therefore dependent not only on the performance of the ARC, but also on the ongoing compliance of the installation, maintenance, signalling, and monitoring arrangements.

Regular audits, inspections, resilience testing, and compliance reviews help ensure ARCs maintain the high levels of operational reliability, business continuity, cyber security, and service quality expected by customers, insurers, emergency services, and regulatory stakeholders.

As monitoring technologies continue to evolve, UK ARCs are increasingly integrating cloud services, dual-path IP signalling, remote video verification, AI-assisted analytics, lone worker protection, and Internet of Things (IoT) monitoring, while maintaining compliance with established industry and police requirements.

Why Standards Matter

Independent certification and compliance provide confidence that an ARC can:

- Operate 24 hours a day, 365 days a year.
- Maintain resilient facilities and communications infrastructure.
- Employ appropriately screened and trained monitoring specialists.
- Protect customer data and system integrity.
- Deliver consistent and auditable response procedures.
- Support police response frameworks through compliant URN-managed systems.

These standards help ensure that UK ARCs remain trusted partners in the protection of people, property, critical infrastructure, and business operations.

=== United States ===
In the United States, central stations are regulated by third-party inspection companies such as Underwriters Laboratories (UL), FM Approvals, and The Monitoring Association (TMA). Central stations are evaluated on specific criteria such as system redundancy, building security, and regulation compliance. Once a central station has demonstrated adherence to the UL requirements, it can receive its certification.

==== The Monitoring Association (TMA) ====
The Monitoring Association (TMA), formerly the Central Station Alarm Association (CSAA), is a non-profit trade association that represents professional monitoring companies, including those listed by a TMA-approved Nationally Recognized Testing Laboratory, such as UL, FM Global, or Intertek/ETL, as well as unlisted companies, integrators, and providers of products and services to the industry. Incorporated in 1950, TMA is legally entitled to represent its members before Congress and regulatory agencies on the local, state and federal levels, and other authorities having jurisdiction (AHJs) over the industry.

The Monitoring Association also inspects and certifies central stations.

=== Australia ===
In Australia, central stations are graded against Australian Standard 2201.2 which addresses both physical construction and operational performance.

Physical performance is graded A, B or C (where A is the highest grading) and includes measures such as the construction of monitoring rooms – higher security monitoring centres have solid concrete and steel construction with mantraps for access that can only be operated internally.

Operational performance is graded 1, 2 or 3 (with one being the highest grading). It includes the ability of the monitoring centre to respond to events – generated by customers' security systems, operational reliability, data retrieval, etc.

Accordingly, the highest grading is A1 and the lowest is C3 however even to be graded at C3 central stations still meet very high standards. There is presently no legislative imperative for an Australian central station to be 'graded' however police may refuse to respond to alarms despatched by non-graded companies and insurers may also deny a claim where an insured customer's system was monitored by an ungraded provider.

The Australian Security Industry Association Limited (ASIAL) runs a grading scheme and publishes a list of graded monitoring centres.

== See also ==
- Burglar alarm
- Fire alarm
- Panic button alarm
- Personal Emergency Response System (PERS)
