= Medical alarm =

Device that summons the presence of medical personnel in an emergency

A medical alarm is an alarm system designed to signal the presence of a hazard requiring urgent attention and to summon emergency medical personnel. Other terms for a medical alarm are Personal Emergency Response System (PERS) or medical alert. It is especially important to recognize the need to respond to situations where the person is unable to summon help.

Alarms vary in mobility, who is notified, types of providers, how a device is worn, sensors, and communication methods.

== Variations ==
=== Mobility ===
- Some alarms have a fixed location, with a button or string on the wall, a landline phone, base station, or motion detectors or radar in a room.. The location of the device is fixed, and is transmitted, so the person contacted knows where the emergency is, without the patient needing to speak.
- Other alarms are mobile, so the patient needs to be able to say where they are. GPS can supplement the location, but average horizontal error is 10-20 meters (33-66 feet) for GPS inside buildings, so it can send help to the wrong building or apartment. Maximum error is even bigger.

=== Who gets notified ===
- The Emergency telephone number (110 and 119 in East Asia, 112 in the EU, 999 in many countries, 911 in North America and the Philippines)
- A call center: Nurses' station in a hospital or senior housing, or Central station in a private company
- A list of contacts

In case emergency responders are ever needed, the user can leave a house key with a neighbor, or in a Real-estate lock box hanging on the front door.

=== Types of providers ===
There are several different types of medical alarm providers:

- Hospitals and senior living, using Nurse call buttons, Bathroom emergency pullstrings and Bed exit alarms to call the nurses' station.
- Companies which provide devices which transmit directly to the country's Emergency telephone number.
- Companies which provide devices which transmit to the company's central station, which arranges for help and has records of the patient's medical needs. The patient may also carry medical information in a clearly marked USB.
- Companies which provide devices which transmit to a list of personal contacts.
- Burglar alarm companies which include buttons for fire, theft and medical emergency in Security alarms. These usually transmit to the company's central station, which arranges for help.

=== Location of devices ===
- Pendant worn around the neck
- Small device worn on the belt
- Wristband and smartwatches
- Wall devices (button, string, motion detector), which need to cover all areas including toilet and shower which have high risk.

=== Sensor(s) ===
- Fall detection sensors, which detect sudden movement, to avoid the patient needing to speak to the call center, but do not sense many falls.
- Movement, step counters, and sleep sensors
- Pulse, blood pressure, and blood oxygen sensors
- Door open/close sensors
- Usage sensor on a device such as a microwave oven

=== Communication ===
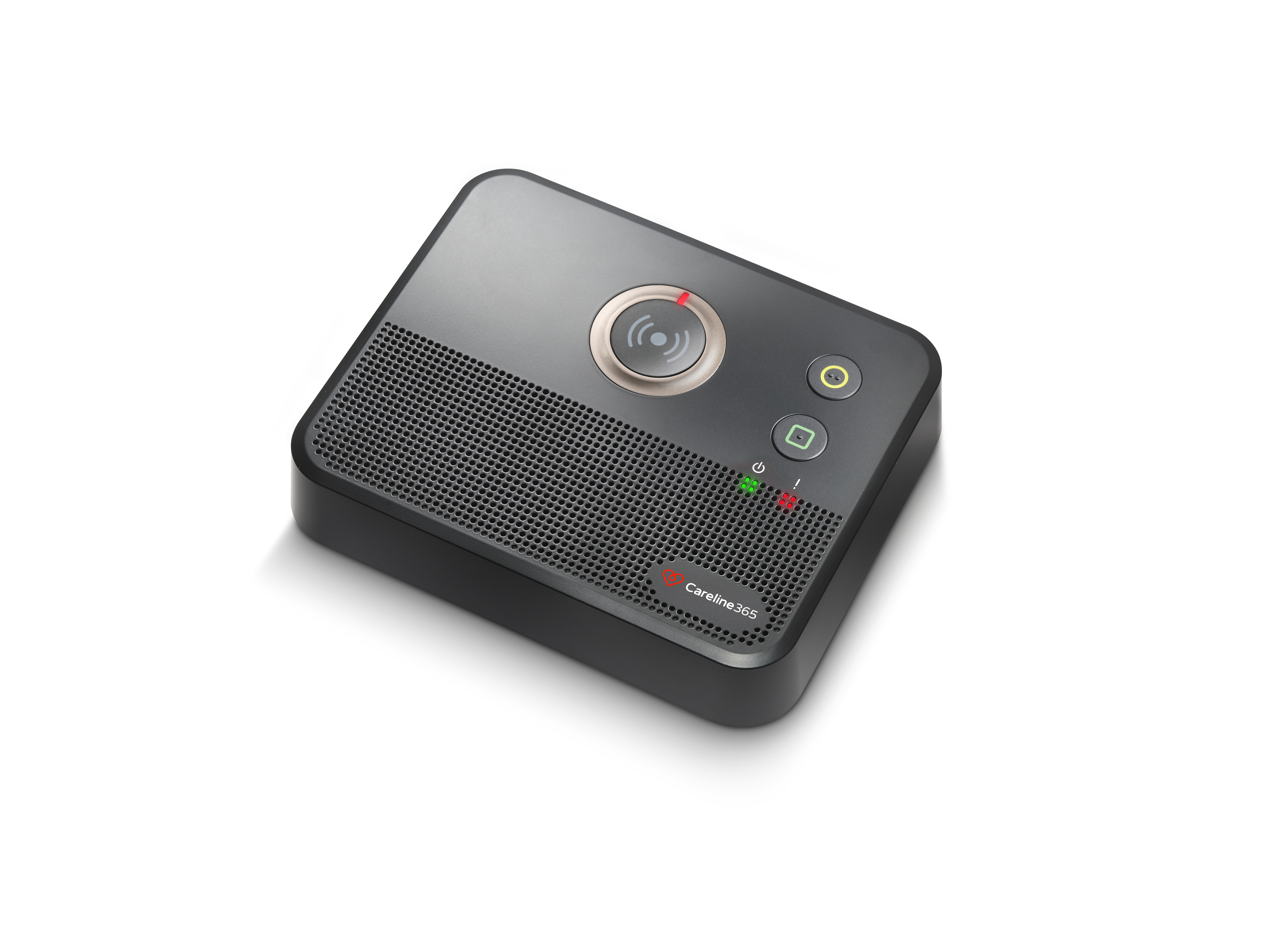
Modern Digital Medical Alarm Hub

- Cellular data access for operation anywhere there is cell phone coverage. This can include a full phone, or a one touch button to call the country's Emergency telephone number.
- Bluetooth connection to a cell phone app or base station. A cell phone app can be monitored by the customer, caregivers, and emergency contacts.
- In-home base station that is connected to a landline, WiFi network, ISDN line, or cellular data network.

Body-worn devices and base stations may contain a speaker, microphone, and call button(s).

Systems with passive alerts may set off a call for help if no movement has been detected over some period of time, or if a fall is detected. If a base station shares a phone line, it is able to terminate an in-progress call so that a call for help can be initiated over the telephone.

There is also the option of a "safety check", on the principle of dead man's switch. A user activates a button several times a day; this confirms that the user is well. If this confirmation goes lacking for a period, someone calls or visits to check. Some solutions will periodically call to converse with the user.

== Monitoring centers ==
Monitoring service centers that are approved by Underwriters Laboratories (UL) have internal backup systems to add redundancy.

Call centers' terms of service generally refuse liability if they fail to answer or fail to call for help. They refuse liability for negligence by staff, even if the customer dies. If liability is imposed anyway, the terms limit it to a small amount. A 2016 law review article said US courts usually accept these limits. The article distinguishes that the alarm company should not be liable for failures by others, but needs to be liable for its own failures. The damage is not known in advance, as with any product, but is more insurable by the company than by the customer. The article says that clauses to avoid liability for the call center's own actions could be declared against public policy, since such clauses remove the strong incentive which damages are designed to create for competent, non-negligent service. As of 2026, contracts still carry the same limits and disavow even implied warranties of fitness for purpose. Besides limits on liability to the customer, the customer must pay (indemnify) costs anyone else asserts against the call center. A New Zealand company has similar limits. One company does generally only refuse liability for things beyond its control.

Companies without a call center, where the device calls friends or the country's Emergency telephone number, may also have limits, though bypassing a call center avoids some types of failure. Some even say their product is not suitable where failure can result in injury or death.

Some monitoring services employ trained medical operators enabling them to better evaluate the severity of medical requests.

== Costs ==
Aside from one time cost for hardware, there are often ongoing fees and sometimes per-activation charges. Some or all of these may be partially funded by reductions on insurance or by an annual prepayment when compared to paying monthly.

- One time outlays: Aside from direct expenditures for sensors, options exist for base-stations and auto-dialers.
- Ongoing fees: These range from zero (self-monitoring) to professional monitoring services.

== Origin of home alerts ==
The concept of home alert systems was conceived and developed in the 1970s. The American implementation was conceived in 1973 by Andrew Dibner, a psychologist on leave from Boston University who was studying personality in advanced age. In Germany, in the early 1970s, Wilhelm Hormann thought about developing a comprehensive structure for ambulatory and non-ambulatory care for the sick, the elderly, those who live alone, and people with disabilities.

Dibner established a company in 1974. Named Lifeline Systems Inc. It manufactured all its own equipment, and by 1984 had 225 employees and served some 42,000 people in 48 states. In 1975 American International Telephone Company offered an emergency home phone system. The user wore a medallion around the neck that when pushed delivered a preprogrammed message to several phone numbers.

Hormann's concept of "home alert" (Hausnotruf) with help from AEG-Telefunken Backnang GmbH was presented to the international public early in 1980. In 1982 the Hausnotruf PERS system was distinguished with the Frankfurt Innovation Prize of the German Economy by the Wirtschaftsclub Rhein Main e.V. (Rhein-Main Business Club) in Frankfurt-am-Main.

A 2012 Swiss estimate reported that around 50,000 emergency call devices were then in use.

== Fraud ==
Federal and state charges have been brought against firms for various forms of fraud involving false promises, improper billing and violations of Do Not Call laws. Systems which create too many false alarms can be fined. Some people have been victimized by fraudulent marketing.

== Medical alarms in pop culture ==
"I've fallen and I can't get up!" was a catchphrase from a 1989 LifeCall Medical Alert System television commercial. In this commercial, an elderly actor is seen fallen and distraught and uses the medical alert system to summon help. The unintentional humor in the commercial made it a frequent punchline for many comedic acts. Due to the trademark changing hands between competing companies, the trademark currently belongs to LifeCall's direct competitor, Life Alert Emergency Response, and is used in all channels of Life Alert's advertising.

== See also ==
- Panic button
