= Personal safety app =

Mobile application for security and emergency assistance

A personal safety app or SOS app is a mobile application designed to provide individuals with additional security and assistance in various situations. These apps offer a range of features and functionalities that users can utilize to enhance their personal safety. Common features include emergency alerts, location sharing, safety tips, SOS buttons, audible alarms, and community safety reporting. Users can employ these apps to quickly send emergency alerts, share their real-time location with trusted contacts, and access safety-related information and resources.

== Features ==
While most personal safety apps are offered as freeware, some are either distributed as a freemium app with paid features which can be unlocked through in-app purchases, supported through advertising, or marketed as paid applications. These include various features, including sending text messages, e-mails, IMs, or even Tweets to close friends (containing approximate location,) or emitting a loud intermittent "shrill whistle" in the manner of a rape alarm. Additional features include geofencing and preventive alerts. Some apps allow to customize the alert message sent and the ringtone that signals the reception of a new alert.

They normally include different triggering mechanisms to cope with different emergency situations. Common triggering mechanisms include pressing and holding the phone's switch button for a few seconds, shaking the phone vigorously, tapping on an alert button, and even loud screaming sound which the app can detect. When the alert signal is triggered, these apps automatically go to work, sending text messages and emails with exact location of the user to emergency contacts listed on the app.

These apps are mostly used by people living alone. Worldwide, approximately 400 million people now live alone, representing about 15% of all households. This number has been steadily climbing for decades, and projections suggest it will continue to rise. In developed nations, the percentage is even higher, often exceeding 25-30% of all households.

In April 2016, the Indian government mandated that all cellphones sold in the country must contain a panic button function by 2017, activated through either a dedicated button or pressing the power key three times.

== Security Concerns ==
Many users have expressed concerns about the safety of personal safety apps and have raised questions regarding how the data collected by these apps is processed and used. These concerns are often related to issues of privacy and data security. Users worry that the personal information, location data, and emergency alerts they share with these apps could be mishandled or accessed by unauthorized parties. Additionally there is a growing awareness of potential risks associated with the storage and transmission of sensitive data. As a result, some users are cautious about using personal safety apps and may choose to limit the information they share or thoroughly review the privacy policies and data handling practices of the apps the use. These concerns underscore the importance of transparent data practices and robust security measures within the personal safety app industry to address and alleviate user apprehensions.

== Inbuilt SOS Features in Mobile Operating Systems ==
In recent years, major technology companies like Apple and Google have incorporated inbuilt SOS features directly into their mobile operating systems. These features are designed to provide users with quick and efficient methods of seeking assistance during emergencies. For instance, Apple's iOS includes an Emergency SOS feature that allows users to rapidly call emergency services and notify designated contacts by pressing a specific combination of hardware buttons or using the device's touchscreen. Similarly Google's Android operating system offers and Emergency Information feature that enables users to input vital medical and emergency contact information accessible even when the device is locked. These inbuilt SOS features offer an additional layer of safety and convenience for users, complementing standalone personal safety apps and reinforcing the importance of technology in enhancing personal security.
