= LG K61 =

2020 smartphone model

- Brand: LG
- Manufacturer: LG Electronics
- Series: LG K series
- First released: April 27, 2020
- Successor: LG K71
- Related: LG K41S; LG K51S
- Compatible networks: GSM, HSPA, LTE
- Form factor: Slate
- Dimensions: 164.5 mm (6.48 in) H 77.5 mm (3.05 in) W 8.4 mm (0.33 in) D
- Weight: 191 g (6.7 oz)
- Operating system: Android 9.0 "Pie"
- System-on-chip: MediaTek MT6765 Helio P35 (12 nm)
- CPU: Octa-core (4x2.3 GHz Cortex-A53 & 4x1.8 GHz Cortex-A53)
- GPU: PowerVR GE8320
- Memory: 4 GB RAM
- Storage: 64 GB or 128 GB
- Removable storage: microSDXC (dedicated slot)
- Battery: Non-removable Li-Po 4000 mAh
- Rear camera: Quad: • 48 MP, f/1.8, 26mm (wide), 1/2.0", 0.8µm, PDAF • 8 MP, f/2.2, 118° (ultrawide) • 2 MP, f/2.4 (macro / depth); LED flash, HDR, panorama Video: 1080p@30fps
- Front camera: 16 MP; Video: 1080p@30fps
- Display: 6.53 in (166 mm) IPS LCD; 1080 × 2340 pixels, 19.5:9 ratio (~394 ppi density)
- Sound: Loudspeaker, 3.5mm audio jack
- Connectivity: Wi-Fi 802.11 a/b/g/n/ac or b/g/n, Bluetooth 5.0 (A2DP, LE), GPS, NFC, USB Type-C 2.0
- Water resistance: MIL-STD-810G compliant
- Model: LM-Q630, LMQ630EAW, LM-Q630EAW

The LG K61 is a discontinued mid-range Android smartphone manufactured, marketed, and designed by LG Electronics, serving part of the K series. It was announced on February 18, 2020 until its launch on April 27 in that year.

== Specifications ==
=== Hardware ===
The LG K61 features a glass front panel with a plastic frame and back cover. Measuring 164.5 x 77.5 x 8.4 mm (6.48 x 3.05 x 0.33 inches) and weighing 191 grams (6.74 oz), the device has passed several MIL-STD-810G military standard tests for durability against shock, vibration, temperature, and humidity. It includes a physical rear-mounted fingerprint sensor for biometric security.

The device is powered by a 12 nm MediaTek MT6765 Helio P35 system-on-chip, which integrates an octa-core CPU (consisting of 4x2.3 GHz Cortex-A53 cores and 4x1.8 GHz Cortex-A53 cores) alongside a PowerVR GE8320 GPU. It comes equipped with 4 GB of RAM and is available in either 64 GB or 128 GB configurations of internal storage, which can be expanded via a dedicated microSDXC card slot.

=== Display ===
The smartphone features a 6.53-inch IPS LCD touchscreen with a resolution of 1080 x 2340 pixels, a 19.5:9 aspect ratio, and a pixel density of approximately 394 ppi. The front panel utilizes scratch-resistant glass and achieves an estimated 82.5% screen-to-body ratio.

=== Cameras ===
The LG K61 is equipped with a rear quad-camera array and a single front-facing camera:

- 48 MP main wide-ange sensor with an f/1.8 aperture, 26mm focal length, 1/2.0" sensor size, 0.8 µm pixel size, and phase-detection autofocus (PDAF).
- 8 MP ultrawide sensor with an f/2.2 aperture and a 118-degree field of view
- 2 MP macro sensor
- 2 MP depth lens

The rear camera layout is assisted by an LED flash and supports software features like High Dynamic Range (HDR) and panorama. The front-facing selfie camera is a single 16 MP lens housed inside a punch-hole cutout in the upper-left corner of the display. Both the front and rear camera setups are capable of recording video at up to 1080p resolution at 30 frames per second.

The device incorporates Quad Pixel pixel-binning technology on both its rear main sensor and its front selfie camera. This feature groups four pixels into one to capture more ambient light, optimizing performance during night photography.

=== Connectivity and Audio ===
The phone features a hybrid or dedicated single/dual Nano-SIM setup depending on the region. For wireless connectivity, it supports dual-band Wi-Fi 802.11 a/b/g/n/ac, Wi-Fi Direct, DLNA, Bluetooth 5.0 (with A2DP and LE), GPS positioning, and Near Field Communication (NFC) for contactless payments.

For audio, the device features a single loudspeaker and a traditional 3.5mm headphone jack, enhanced with DTS:X Virtual Surround sound profiles. It relies on a USB Type-C 2.0 port for data transfer and charging.

=== Battery and Software ===
The handset runs on a non-removable 4,000 mAh Lithium-Polymer (Li-Po) battery, supporting standard 10W wired charging. It originally shipped with Android 9.0 (Pie) out of the box and was later made upgradeable to newer iterations of Android depending on carrier and regional rollouts.

== Reception ==
Notebookcheck reviewer Florian Schmitt noted that while the primary and wide-angle cameras deliver sufficient exposure—even in low-light environments—the resulting images frequently lack detail and exhibit blurriness. Additionally, low-light photography is hindered by inconsistent autofocus performance. Video recording is limited to 1080p at 30 fps and shares the same soft image quality as the still cameras.
