= Panic button =

Device that alerts others to the presence of an emergency

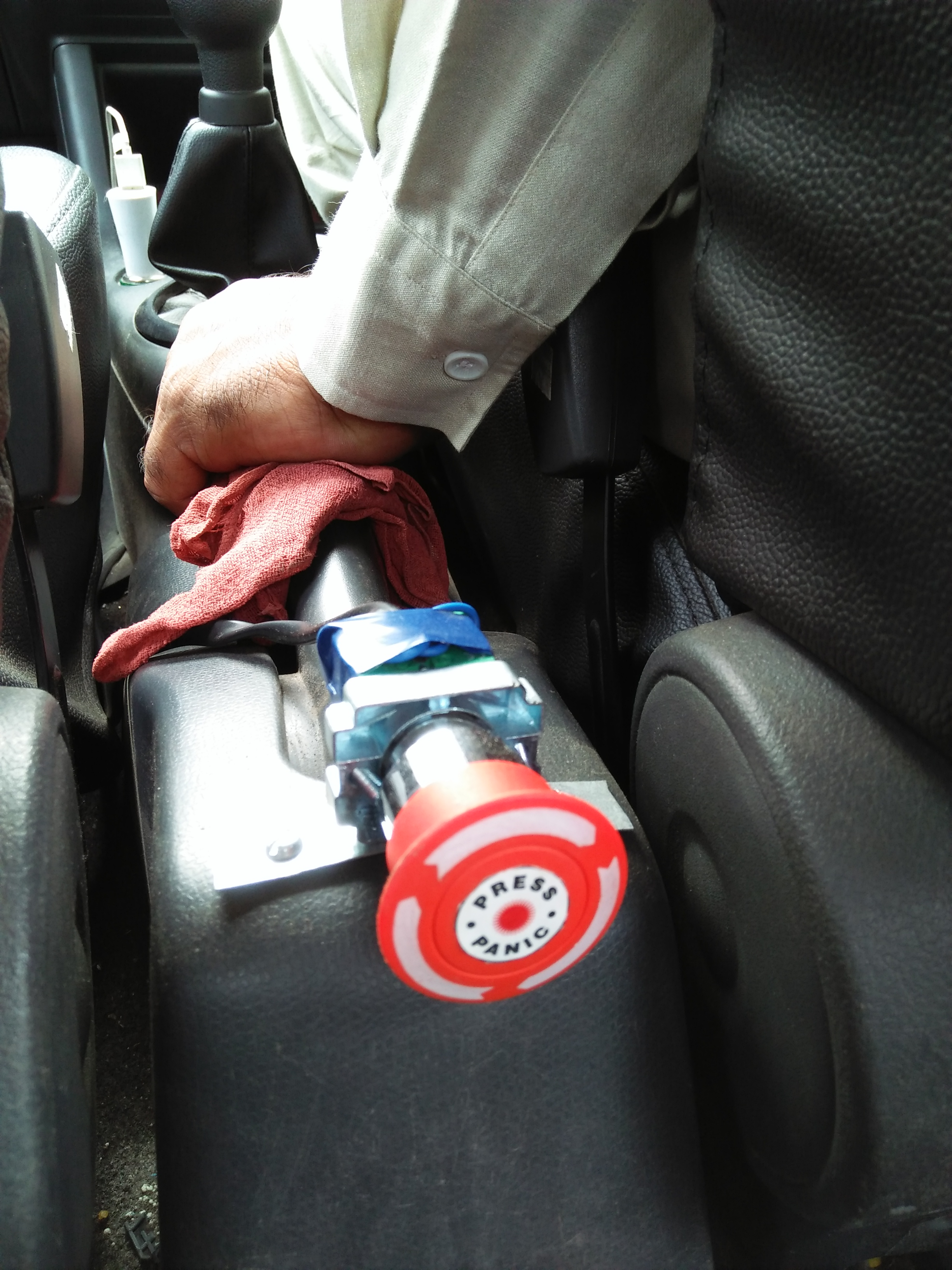
A panic button in an Ola cab in Kolkata, for passenger use

A panic alarm is an electronic device that can easily be activated to request help during an emergency where danger to persons or property exists. It is designed to contact assistance quicker, easier, and simpler (in some cases, less conspicuously) than a conventional phone call.

A panic alarm is frequently but not always controlled by a concealed panic alarm button. These buttons can be connected to a monitoring center or locally via a silent alarm or an audible bell/siren. The alarm can be used to request emergency assistance from local security, police or emergency services. Some systems can also activate closed-circuit television to record or assess the event.

Many panic alarm buttons lock on when pressed, and require a key to reset them. Others may have a short delay during which time the request of help can be cancelled.

== Alarm ==
Examples of alarm panic buttons are:

- A button in a critical system (such as a nuclear weapons system) used to quickly activate an extreme measure to mitigate an emergency situation.
- A red button integral to key fobs which activates a car alarm's siren.
- A device given to elderly individuals in order to maintain their independence outside of a care facility, while still affording them a means of summoning help should they require it (i.e. a medical emergency that renders them immobile, like a fall, injury or illness). Such a device can also be referred to as an Emergency Medical Alert (EMA) button and can be fitted as either a pendant or bracelet to be worn by the user. MAB's (Medical Alert Bracelets) are usually wirelessly connected to a call center. When the alarm is raised, an operator will call the individual's home to ensure a false alarm has not occurred; if there is no answer, the operator will alert either family members, emergency services, or both.
- A button similar to the above, which is used indoors in self-sufficient houses for elderly people, where it alerts someone inside the house, who will then first check for a false alarm by phoning the person, and if there is no false alarm, will enter the person's flat to determine what the problem is.
- A button used in convenience stores, gas stations, or other establishments staffed with a single employee during late hours. Often located under the counter near the cash register or safe, the button can be pressed in times of distress (such as robbery, disruptive or threatening behavior, or other situation which in the operator's estimation warrants assistance), triggering a silent alarm. If the button alerts a private security company, a fee may be charged each time the button is used to prevent misuse, thus encouraging the operator to use the alert responsibly and only when justifiably warranted.
- A button that is wearable and given to employees in the workplace that can be used to request help from onsite and offsite responders during an emergency.

== Medical alert ==
A medical alert panic button or medical alarm is an electronic device worn on a bracelet or necklace as part of a medical alert system. When pressed, it sends a wireless signal to alarm monitoring staff, or to a home console which dials alarm monitoring staff and alerts them of an emergency condition. Depending on the severity of the situation, alarm monitoring staff will summon friends, family, or emergency services. A panic button alarm is a self-contained electronic device powered by an internal long-life battery, typically Waterproof and designed to be shock resistant and highly durable.

In a medical emergency, the advantage over a simple cell phone is that the person in distress may not have the ability to dial the three digits for 911, and may not have the capability to vocalize. The end user does need to enter information prior to when it will be used.

== Holdup alarms ==
Holdup alarms are alarms that require a person under duress to covertly trigger the alarm to summon the proper authorities. These types of alarms are most commonly found in retail establishments and financial institutions, but are sometimes an integrated feature of home burglar alarms. The trigger could be a push button, electronic money clip, a foot rail, or a number of other things. Either the person under duress or a witness can activate this kind of alarm. For example, if someone is ambushed outside of their home and told to disable their alarm system they can possibly enter a special duress code that is different from their normal deactivation code to notify authorities without arousing suspicion. These alarms are almost always silent and usually require a manual reset with a key or a special code.

== Taxi alarm ==
The purpose of a taxi alarm is for situations when either the driver or the passenger feel unsafe due to threatening behavior by the other or by an outside party, access to an alarm, silent or traditional sound, both to scare off the attacker and to summon help.

== Personal alarm ==
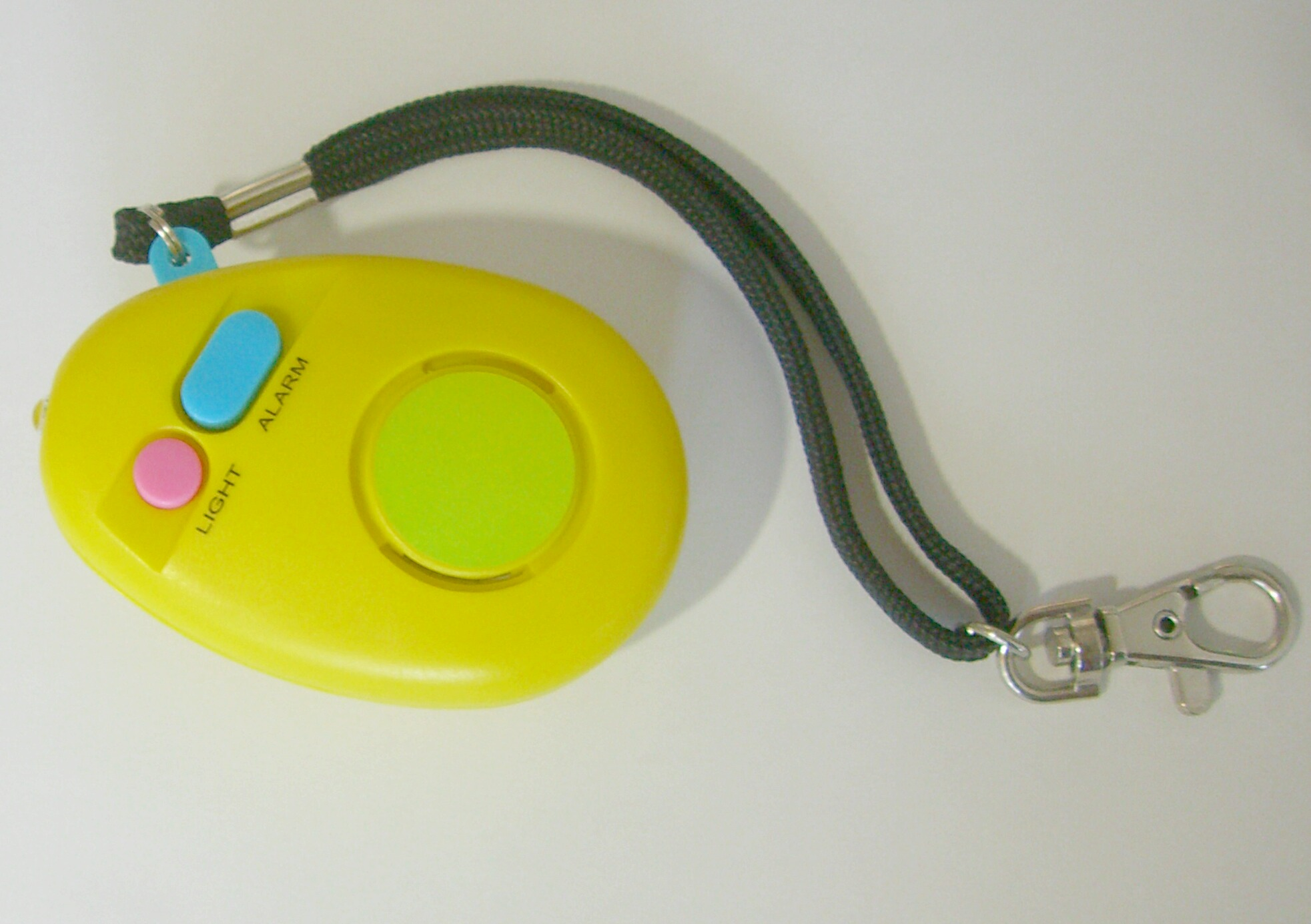
A personal safety alarm starts sounding once the emergency button is pressed.

A personal alarm is a small hand-held electronic device with the functionality to emit a loud siren-like alarming sound. It is activated either by a button, or a cord that, when pulled, sets the siren off. It is used to attract attention in order to scare off an assailant. The sound emitted can also have the effect of distracting, disorienting, or surprising the assailant.

The volume varies from model to model, with some models reaching 130 decibels. Some personal alarms are also outfitted with an LED light for normal lighting purposes or to help deter an assailant. Due attention must be given to the fact that these devices can give a 'false sense of security' and therefore place the individual in danger. Some personal safety apps emit a loud intermittent "shrill whistle", in the manner of a personal alarm.

== Monitoring services ==
The monitoring service (central station) is a call center facility that is staffed at all times to receive calls from the system console. Monitoring service centers that are approved by Underwriters Laboratories (UL) have internal backup systems to add redundancy. Some monitoring services employ trained operators enabling them to better evaluate the severity of help requests. In most less developed countries however, response to panic alarms are slow.

== MIDI ==
In a MIDI instrument when the note-off message for a played note is not received, the note will sound on endlessly, and also has the potential to rise in amplitude enough to damage the speakers or other components in the sound system. Hitting the panic button will send a note-off command to all keys, stopping any notes that were still playing.

== Web design ==
Many websites that provide crisis counseling information incorporate a prominent quick exit button. This functionality can be important for survivors of domestic violence, who may only be able to access such resources from equipment owned by the abuser. A visitor under duress can click the button to immediately leave the site for a more mundane site and potentially perform other steps to cover their tracks, such as replacing the contents of the original webpage with something unrelated. In the United Kingdom, the Government Digital Service's gov.uk design system has standardized an "exit this page" component that sends the visitor to BBC Weather's homepage.

== Popular culture ==
The phrase "pressing the panic button" is part of pop culture, and "Time to Start Work on a Panic Button?" was a New York Times 2011 headline on an article about planning for global warming.

Humorous variants of such a panic button also exist, such as a wearable button bearing only the word "PANIC" or an adhesive key, meant to look like a key for a computer keyboard, usually red, and also bearing only the word "PANIC". Related to this is the 'boss key' or 'boss button' - a keyboard shortcut "to quickly hide whatever you're viewing." One 2014 newspaper article described a related browser feature actually called PanicButton.

== See also ==
- Don't panic
- Duress code
- Kill switch
- Panic
- Pepper spray
- SCRAM
- Self-defense
- Self-defence in international law
- Stand-your-ground law
