= LG K41S =

Android smartphone

LG K41s
- Brand: LG Electronics
- Series: LG K series
- First released: February 18, 2020
- Availability by region: April 27, 2020
- Discontinued: Yes
- Related: LG K51S; LG K61
- Compatible networks: 2G, 3G, 4G LTE
- Form factor: Slate
- Colors: Titanium, Black, White
- Dimensions: 165.8 mm (6.53 in) H 76.5 mm (3.01 in) W 8.3 mm (0.33 in) D
- Weight: 191.7 g (6.76 oz)
- Operating system: Android 9.0 (Pie) 32-bit, up to Android 11
- System-on-chip: Mediatek MT6762 Helio P22 (12 nm)
- CPU: Octa-core 2.0 GHz Cortex-A53
- GPU: PowerVR GE8320
- Memory: 3 GB RAM
- Storage: 32 GB eMMC 5.1
- Removable storage: microSDXC (dedicated slot)
- Battery: Non-removable Li-Po 4000 mAh
- Rear camera: Quad: • 13 MP, f/2.0, 28mm (wide), PDAF • 5 MP, f/2.2, 115° (ultrawide) • 2 MP (macro) • 2 MP (depth); LED flash, panorama, HDR; Video: 1080p@30fps
- Front camera: 8 MP; Video: 1080p@30fps
- Display: 6.55 in (166 mm) IPS LCD; 720 x 1600 pixels, 20:9 ratio (~268 ppi density)
- Sound: Loudspeaker, 3.5mm jack
- Connectivity: Wi-Fi 802.11 b/g/n, Wi-Fi Direct, DLNA, Bluetooth 5.0 (A2DP, LE), GPS, NFC, USB Type-C 2.0 (OTG)
- Data inputs: Fingerprint (rear-mounted), accelerometer, proximity, compass
- Model: LMK410EMW, LM-K410EMW, LM-K410

The LG K41S is a discontinued entry-level Android smartphone manufactured, designed, and marketed by LG Electronics, serving part of the K series. Alongside K51S and K61, it was announced on February 18, 2020 and released on April 27 for Europe and Central and Southern American countries in that year. It was also rolled out to other territories, starting Spain on May 18, and on June 10 for Brazilian markets.

== Specifications ==
=== Design and Hardware ===
The LG K41S features dimensions of 165.8 x 76.5 x 8.3 mm (6.53 x 3.01 x 0.33 in) and weighs 191.7 grams (6.77 oz). It was made available in three color variants: Titanium, Black, and White. Depending on the target region, the device supports either a Single SIM (Nano-SIM) or a Dual SIM (Nano-SIM, dual stand-by) configuration. The phone is notable for being built to MIL-STD-810G compliance standards, offering increased resistance to minor shocks and drops under controlled testing parameters.

The device is powered by a MediaTek MT6762 Helio P22 chipset, built on a 12-nanometer manufacturing process. The system-on-chip includes an octa-core CPU with Cortex-A53 cores clocked up to 2.0 GHz, coupled with an Imagination Technologies PowerVR GE8320 GPU. The K41S comes configured with 32 GB of internal eMMC 5.1 storage alongside 3 GB of RAM. Storage expansion is supported via a dedicated microSDXC card slot.

The phone is equipped with a non-removable 4,000 mAh Lithium-Polymer (Li-Po) battery, charged via a bottom-mounted USB Type-C 2.0 interface which also supports USB On-The-Go (OTG). Security is handled via a physical, rear-mounted capacitive fingerprint sensor, positioned below the camera module. Additional sensors include an accelerometer, a proximity sensor, and a digital compass.

=== Display ===
The smartphone features a 6.55-inch IPS LCD panel with a 20:9 aspect ratio and a resolution of 720 x 1600 pixels, producing a pixel density of approximately 268 pixels per inch (ppi). The display yields an estimated 81.7% screen-to-body ratio and is protected by a layer of scratch-resistant glass.

=== Cameras ===
The LG K41S carries a quad-camera arrangement on its rear panel:

- 13-megapixel main sensor with an f/2.0 aperture, 28mm wide-angle lens, and Phase Detection Autofocus (PDAF).
- 5-megapixel ultra-wide sensor with an f/2.2 aperture and a 115-degree field-of-view.
- 2-megapixel macro sensor
- 2-megapixel auxiliary sensor/depth lens

The rear setup is assisted by an LED flash, supporting features such as High Dynamic Range (HDR) and panorama stitching. Video capture on the main array maxes out at 1080p resolution at 30 frames per second. On the front, a single 8-megapixel selfie camera is housed inside a notch, which is also capable of capturing 1080p video at 30 frames per second.

=== Connectivity and Audio ===
Connectivity on the LG K41S includes support for GSM, HSPA, and 4G LTE networks, capable of speeds up to LTE Cat4 (150 Mbps download / 50 Mbps upload). Local wireless capabilities include Wi-Fi 802.11 b/g/n, Wi-Fi Direct, and DLNA support. The device implements Bluetooth 5.0 with A2DP and Low Energy (LE) profiles. Satellite navigation is provided via GPS, and Near Field Communication (NFC) is available for contactless transactions. It does not include an analog FM radio tuner.

Audio architecture consists of a built-in loudspeaker and a legacy 3.5 mm headphone jack.

=== Software ===
The LG K41S launched out of the box running a 32-bit version of Android 9.0 (Pie), updateable up to Android 11, skinned with LG's proprietary user interface.
