= LG K92 =

Discontinued Android smartphone manufactured by LG

- Brand: LG Electronics
- Manufacturer: LG Electronics
- Type: Smartphone
- Series: LG K series
- First released: September 29, 2020; 5 years ago
- Compatible networks: 2G / 3G / 4G LTE / 5G NR
- Form factor: Slate
- Dimensions: 166.4 mm (6.55 in) H 77.2 mm (3.04 in) W 8.4 mm (0.33 in) D
- Weight: 202.4 g (7.14 oz)
- Operating system: Android 10 with LG UX
- System-on-chip: Snapdragon 690 5G (8 nm)
- CPU: Octa-core (2x2.0 GHz Kryo 560 Gold & 6x1.7 GHz Kryo 560 Silver)
- GPU: Adreno 619L
- Memory: 6 GB RAM
- Storage: 128 GB
- SIM: Dual SIM (Nano-SIM, dual stand-by)
- Battery: 4000 mAh
- Charging: Quick Charge 4.0
- Rear camera: 64 MP, f/1.8, 25mm (wide), 1/1.97", 0.7 μm, PDAF; 5 MP, f/2.2, 115˚ (ultrawide), 1/5.0", 1.12 μm 2 MP, f/2.4, (macro); 2 MP, f/2.4, (depth); Quad-LED flash, panorama, HDR; 4K@30fps, 1080p@30fps
- Front camera: 16 MP, f/2.0, 27mm (wide), 1/3.06, 1.0 μm 1080p@30fps
- Display: 6.7 in (170 mm); 1080 x 2400 resolution, 20:9 aspect ratio (~393 ppi density)
- Sound: Stereo speakers
- Connectivity: Wi-Fi 802.11 a/b/g/n/ac, dual-band, Wi-Fi Direct, hotspot Bluetooth 5.1, A2DP, LE; A-GPS, GLONASS, GALILEO
- Data inputs: Multi-touch screen USB Type-C 3.1

LG K92 is a mid-range Android smartphone manufactured by LG Electronics, announced and released on 29 September 2020 for AT&T. The device has since been discontinued following LG's exit from the mobile phone market.

== Specifications ==
=== Hardware and design ===
The LG K92 5G features a slate form factor, measuring 166.4 x 77.2 x 8.4 mm (6.55 x 3.04 x 0.33 inches) and weighing 202.4 grams (7.13 oz). It supports dual Nano-SIM configuration with dual stand-by capability. The device features a side-mounted fingerprint sensor integrated into the power button, alongside physical hardware keys for volume controls, and comes in a "Titan Gray" color scheme.

=== Display ===
The smartphone is equipped with a 6.7-inch IPS LCD capacitive touchscreen, occupying approximately 84.4% of the front panel with a screen-to-body ratio. The display offers a Full HD+ resolution of 1080 x 2400 pixels at a 20:9 aspect ratio, yielding a pixel density of roughly 393 pixels per inch (ppi). A punch-hole cutout at the top-center houses the front-facing camera.

=== Platform and memory ===
The LG K92 5G is powered by the Qualcomm SM6350 Snapdragon 690 5G system-on-chip, built on an 8-nanometer fabrication process. The octa-core central processing unit (CPU) consists of two high-performance Kryo 560 Gold cores clocked at 2.0 GHz and six power-efficient Kryo 560 Silver cores clocked at 1.7 GHz. Graphics processing is handled by an integrated Adreno 619L GPU.

The device comes in a singular memory configuration featuring 6 GB of RAM paired with 128 GB of internal storage. Storage expansion is supported via a dedicated microSDXC card slot. It launched running the Android 10 operating system out of the box.

=== Cameras ===
The rear of the device features a quad-camera system accented by a distinct quad-LED flash module. The camera array consists of:

- 64-megapixel main / wide sensor with an f/1.8 aperture, 25mm focal length, 1/1.97" sensor size, 0.7 µm pixel size, and Phase Detection Autofocus (PDAF)
- 5 MP ultrawide sensor with an f/2.2 aperture, 115-degree field of view, 1/5.0" sensor size, and 1.12 µm pixel size
- 2 MP macro with an f/2.4 aperture
- 2 MP auxiliary with an f/2.4 aperture

The rear camera ecosystem supports features such as high dynamic range (HDR) imaging, panoramic stitching, and video recording capacities up to 4K resolution at 30 frames per second (fps) as well as 1080p at 30fps.

The front-facing selfie camera comprises a single 16 MP wide-angle lens with an f/2.0 aperture, 27mm focal length, 1/3.06" sensor size, and 1.0 µm pixel size, supporting video capture at 1080p at 30fps.

=== Audio and Connectivity ===
The K92 5G includes built-in stereo loudspeakers and retains a 3.5mm legacy headphone jack. Wireless communication is handled via dual-band Wi-Fi 802.11 a/b/g/n/ac with Wi-Fi Direct support, and Bluetooth 5.1 supporting A2DP and Low Energy (LE). Global positioning and navigation capabilities are implemented through GPS, GLONASS, and GALILEO systems. The handset features Near Field Communication (NFC) but lacks an infrared port or FM radio receiver. Wired data transfer and charging are routed through a USB Type-C 3.1 interface. Additional onboard hardware sensors include an accelerometer, proximity sensor, and compass.

=== Battery ===
Powering the device is a non-removable Lithium-Polymer (Li-Po) 4000 mAh battery. The device supports fast charging capabilities via Qualcomm's Quick Charge 4.0 standard.

== Reception ==
PCMag reviewer Steven Winkelman noted that while the skin had become more user-friendly compared to previous iterations, it still featured significant visual and navigational modifications from stock Android, such as customized icons, a reorganized Settings menu, and a modified Search bar. Additionally, the phone contained approximately two dozen pre-installed carrier and third-party applications (bloatware) totaling nearly 15 GB of storage. At the time of its release, future software support and upgrades to Android 11 remained unconfirmed by LG.
