= Form factor (mobile phones) =

Phone's size, shape and style

The Samsung Galaxy Z series are foldable smartphones.

The form factor of a mobile phone is its size, shape, and style, as well as the layout and position of its major components.

== With one non-movable section ==
=== Bar ===
A bar (also known as a slab, block, candybar) phone takes the shape of a cuboid, usually with rounded corners and/or edges. The name is derived from the rough resemblance to a chocolate bar in size and shape. This form factor is widely used by a variety of manufacturers, such as Nokia and Sony Ericsson. Bar-type smartphones commonly have the screen and keypad on a single face. Sony had a well-known 'Mars Bar' phone model CM-H333 in 1993 that was longer and thinner than the typical bar phone. Bar phones without a full keyboard tend to have a 3×4 numerical keypad; text is often generated on such systems using the Text on 9 keys algorithm.

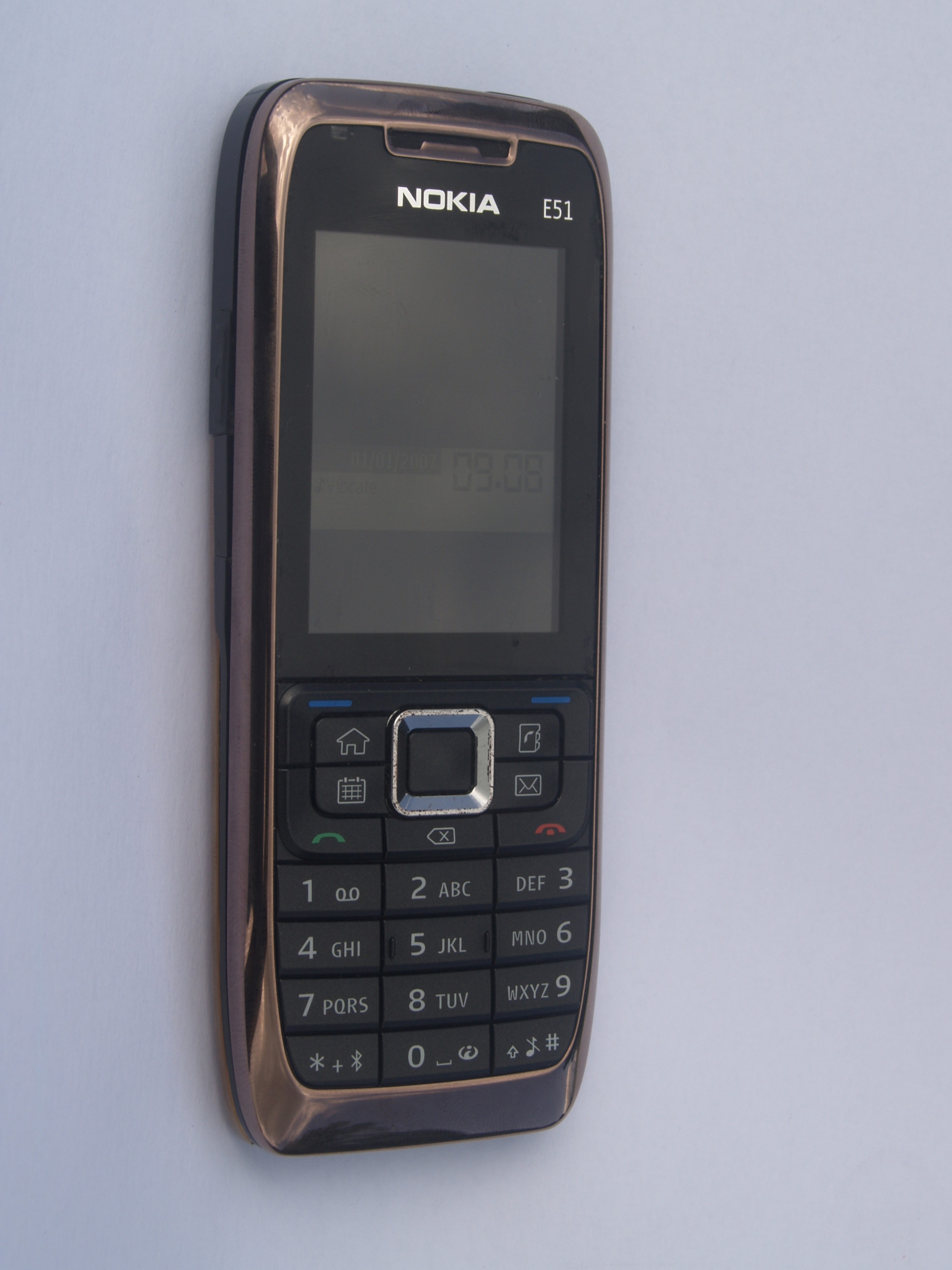
A Nokia E51, a typical bar phone

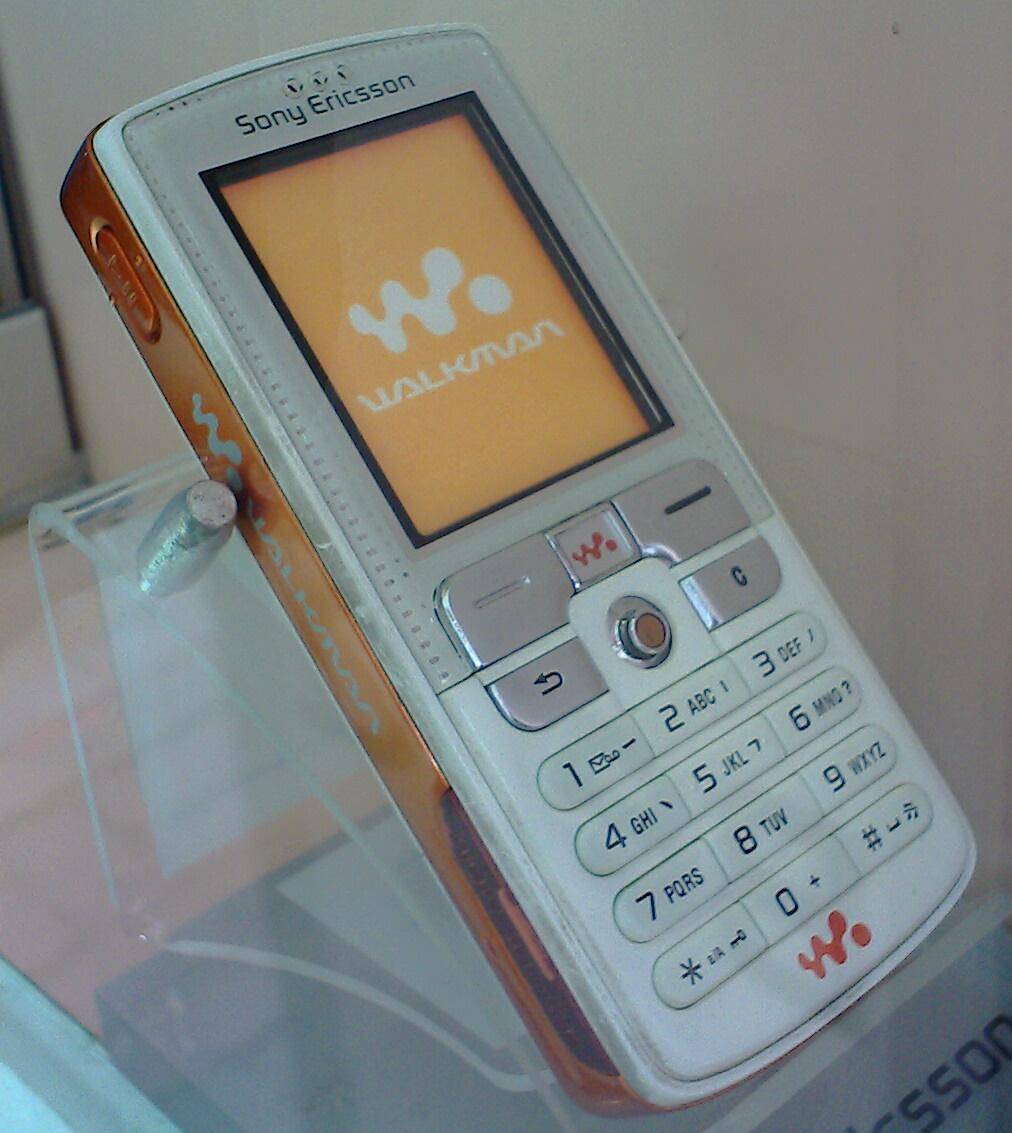
Sony Ericsson W800i, released 2005

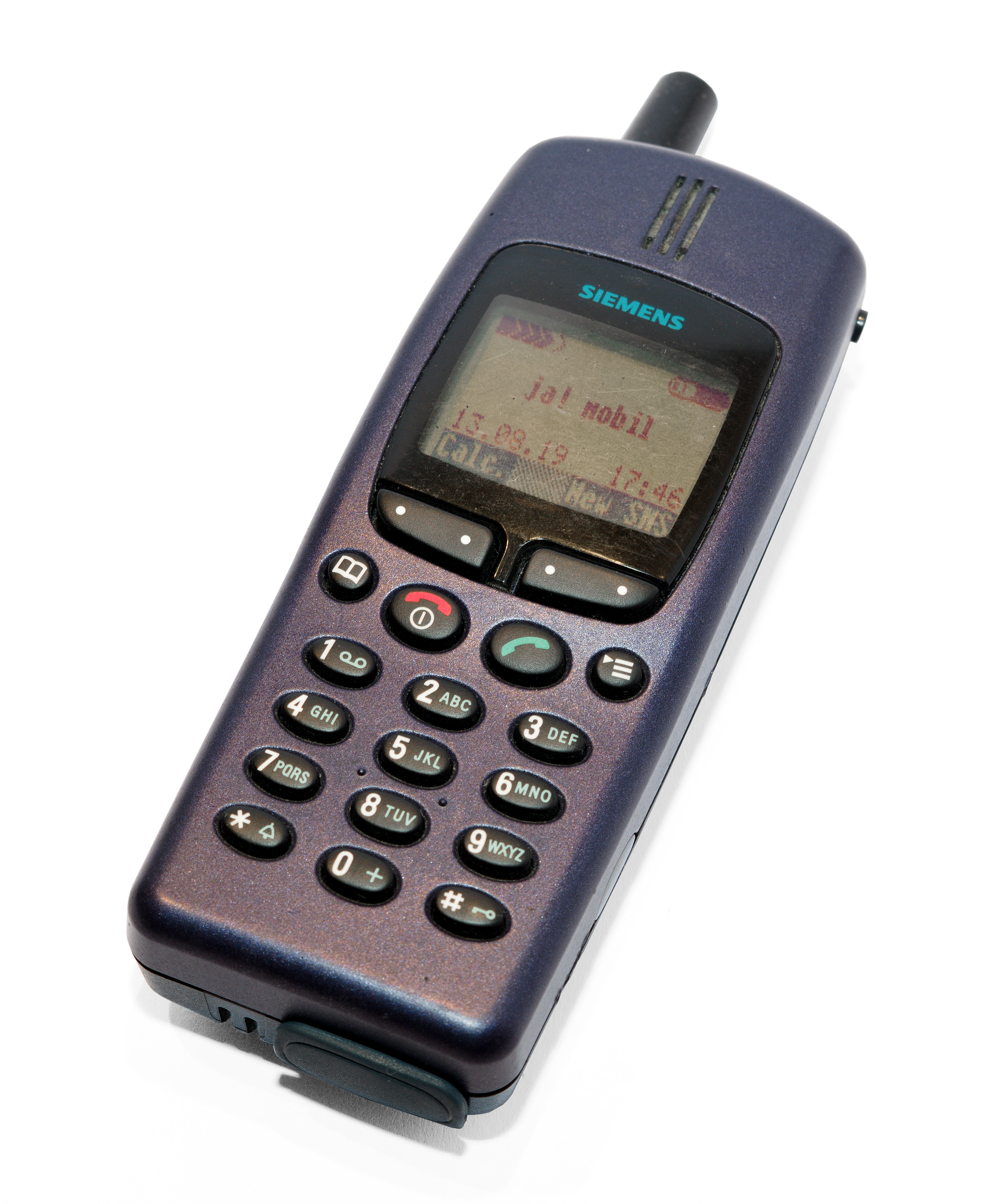
Siemens S25 from 1999

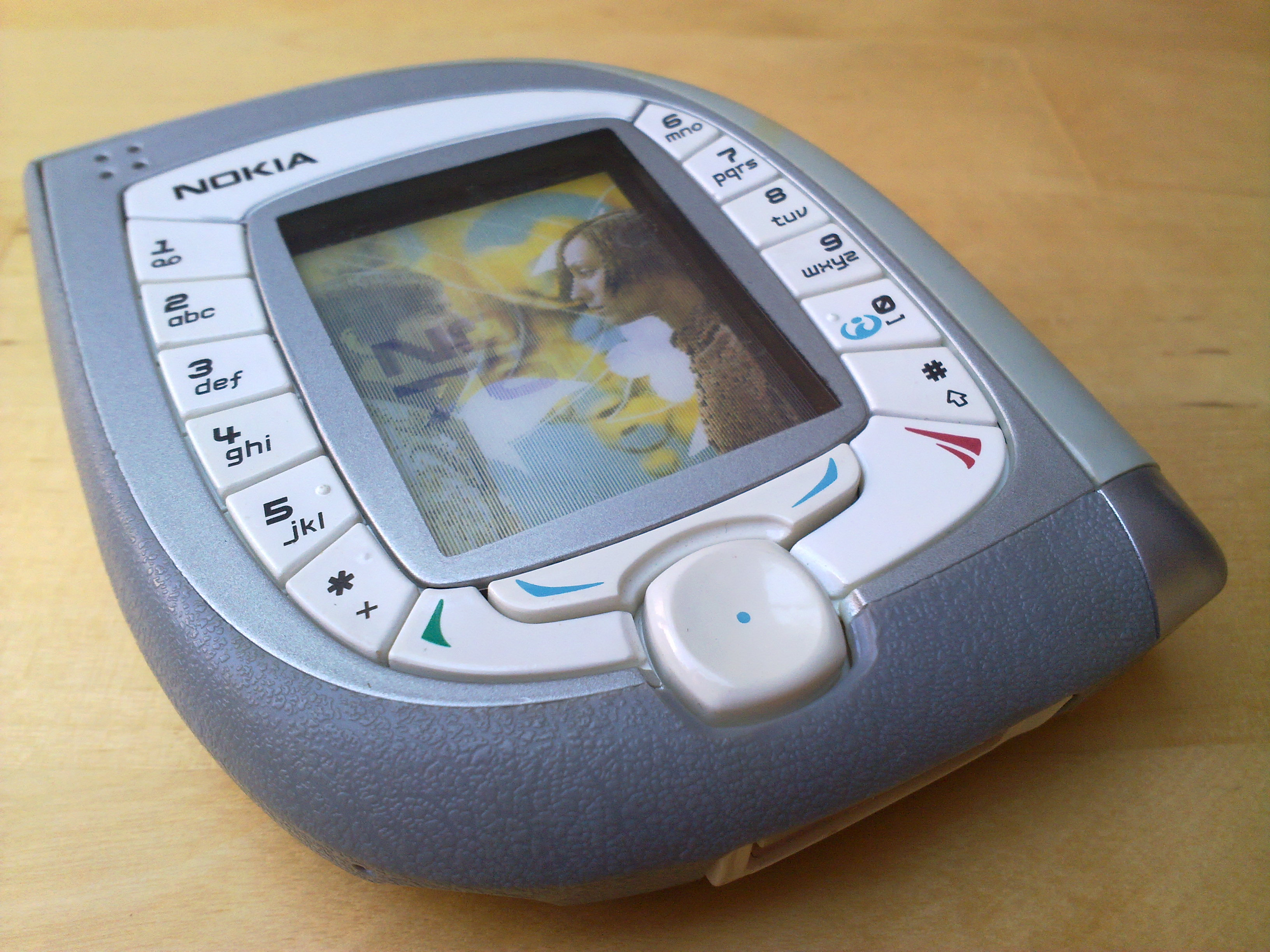
Nokia 7600 in an unusual bar shape

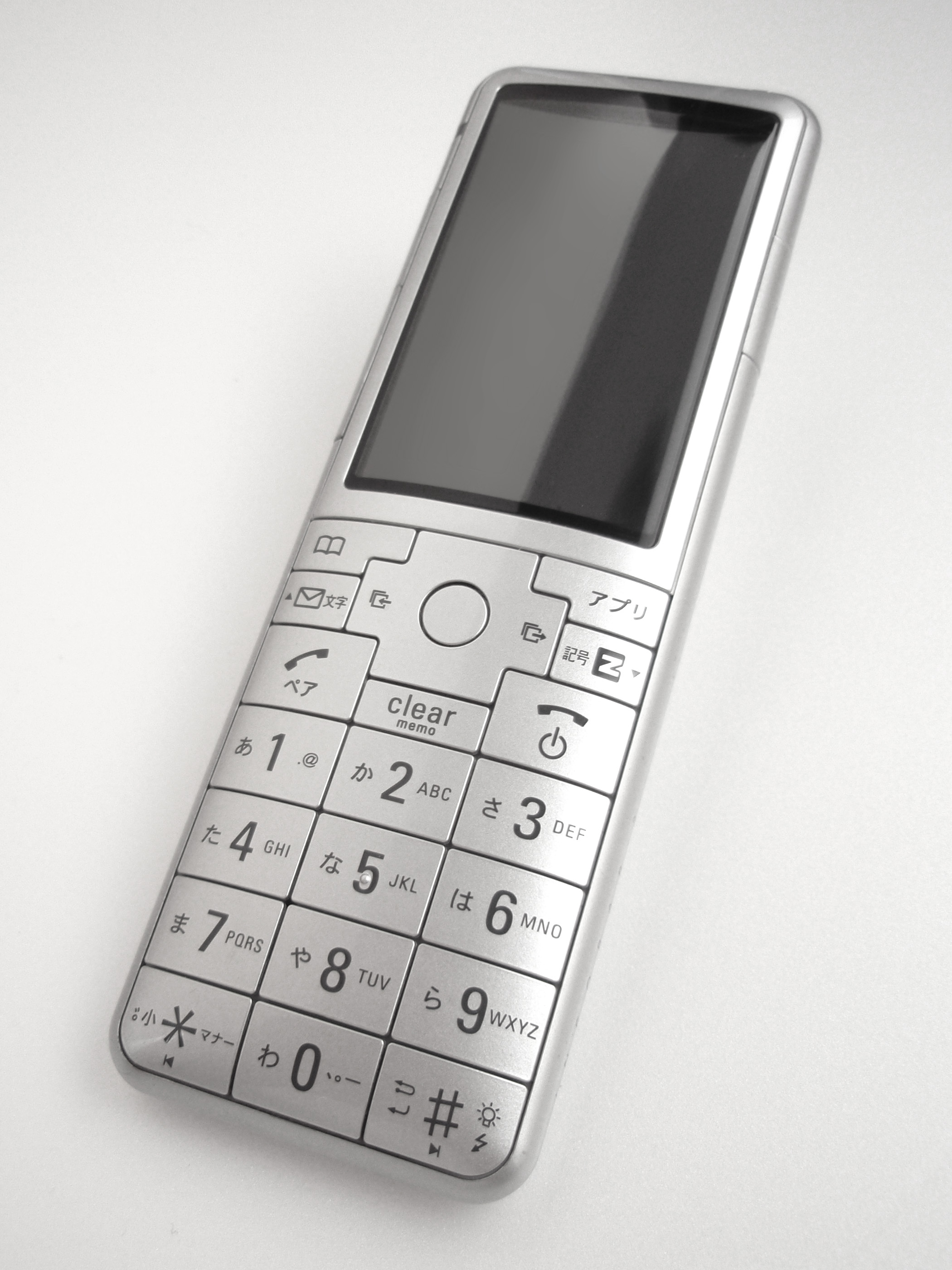
Infobar designed by Naoto Fukasawa from 2007

==== Keyboard bars ====
These are variants of bars that have a full QWERTY keyboard on the front. While they are technically the same as a regular bar phone, the keyboard and all the buttons make them look significantly different. Devices like these were popular in the mid to late 2000s, but lost popularity afterward. The BlackBerry line from Research In Motion (RIM) was particularly popular and influential in this category. The Unihertz Titan series is a series of QWERTY bar phones with modern Android software, produced in the 2020s. The Zinwa Q25 (2025) is a BlackBerry Classic rebuilt with new internals and Android.

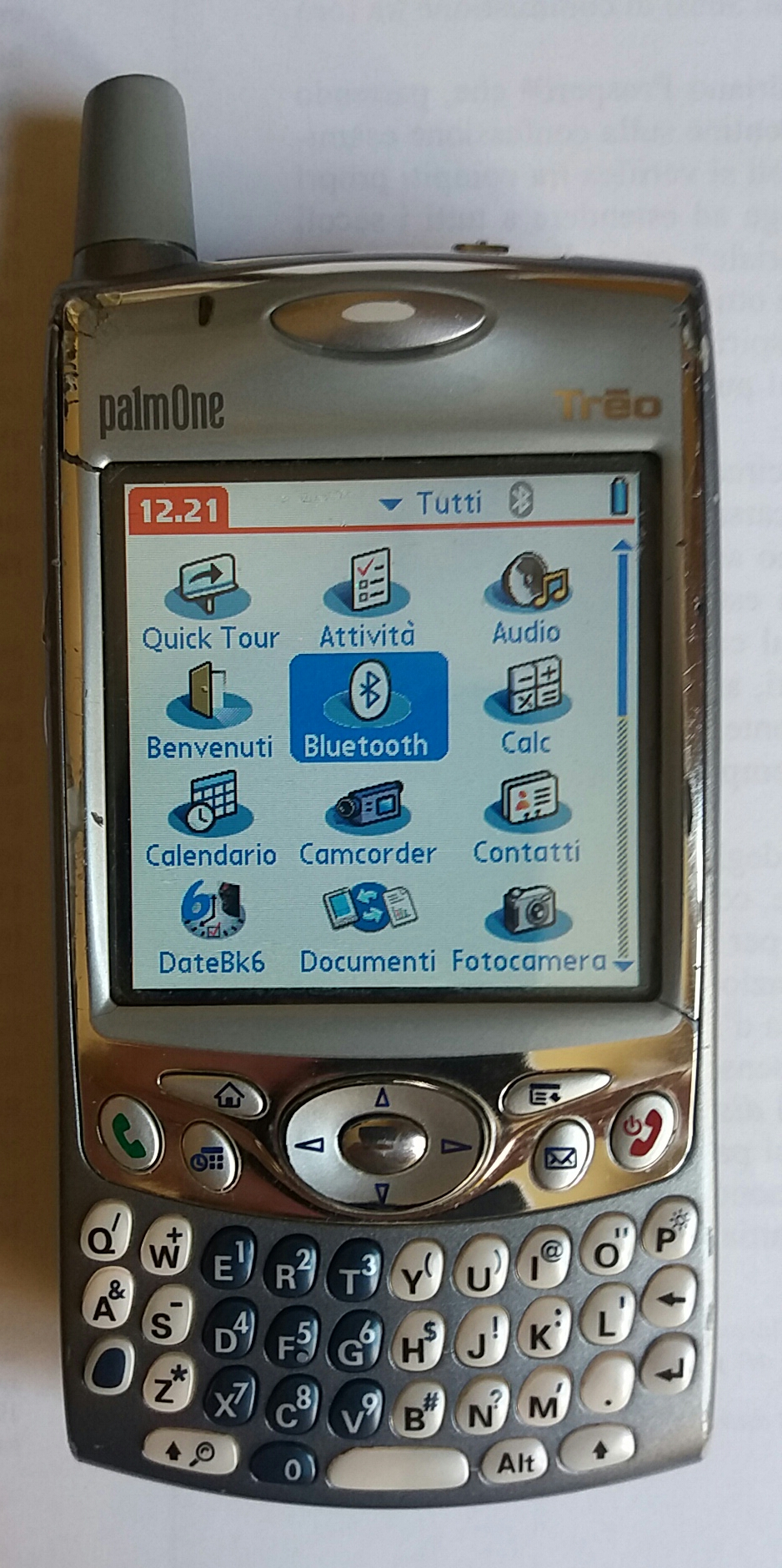
Palm Treo 650

Motorola Q

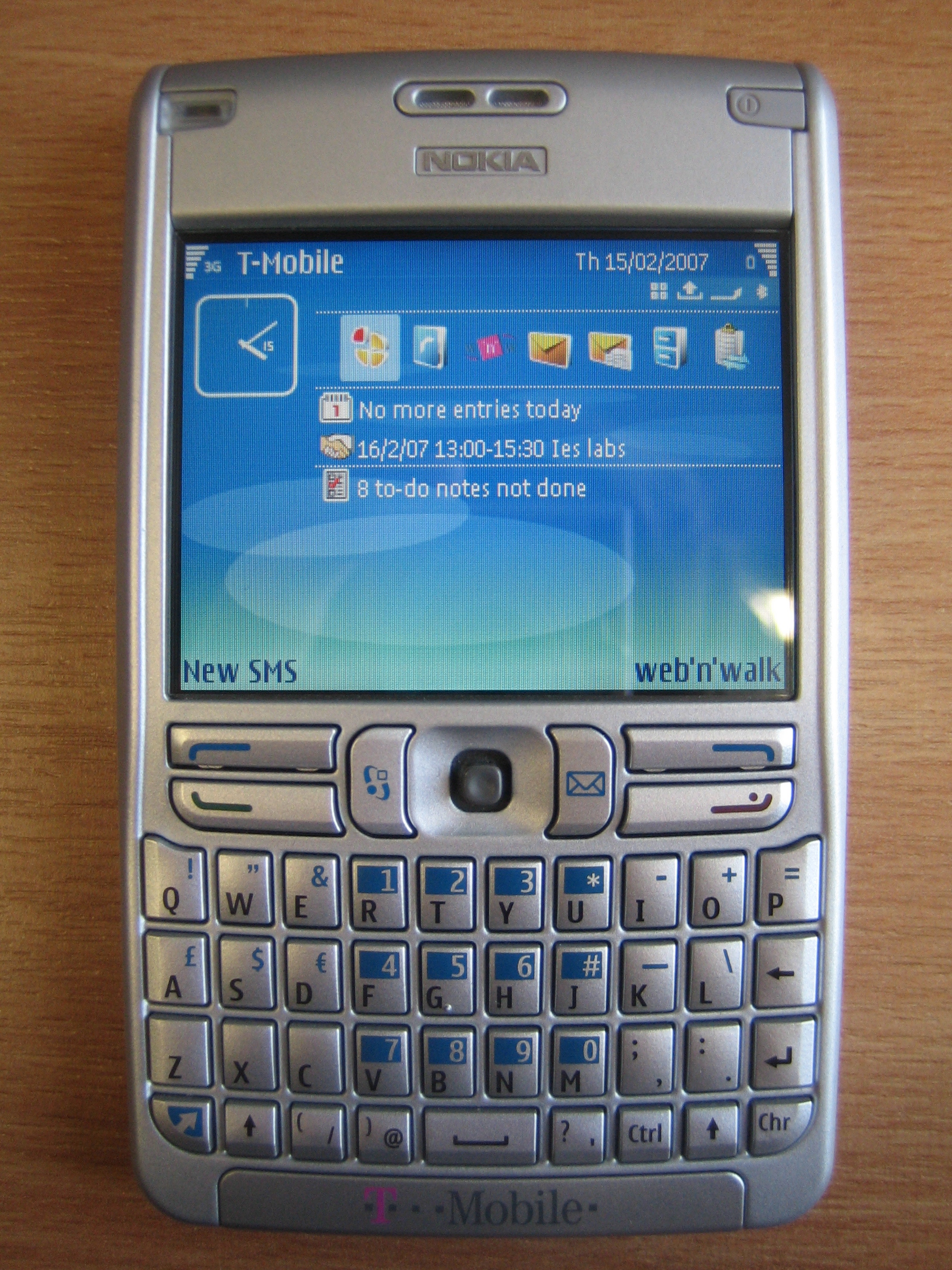
Nokia E61 released 2006

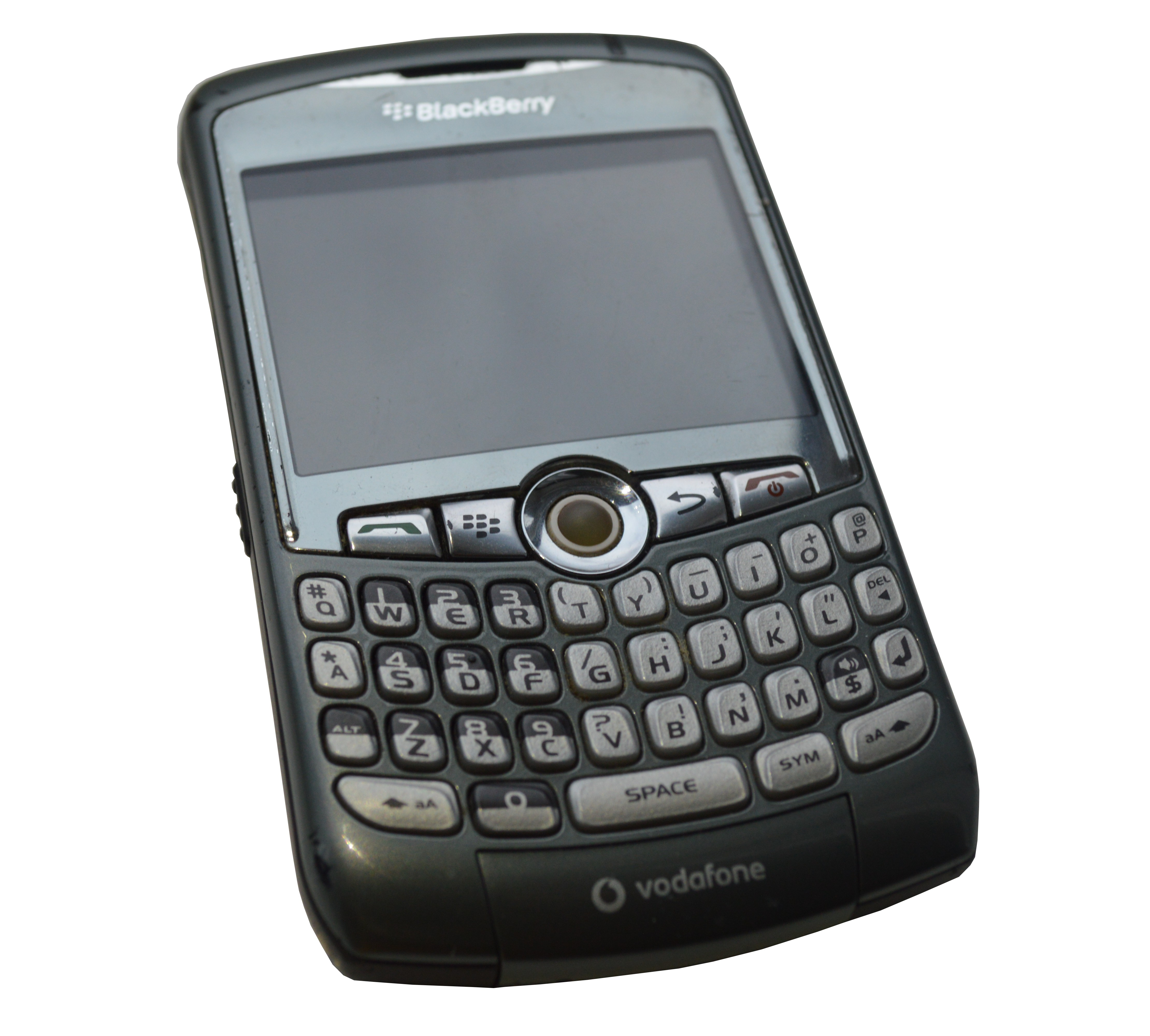
A BlackBerry Curve 8310 from 2007

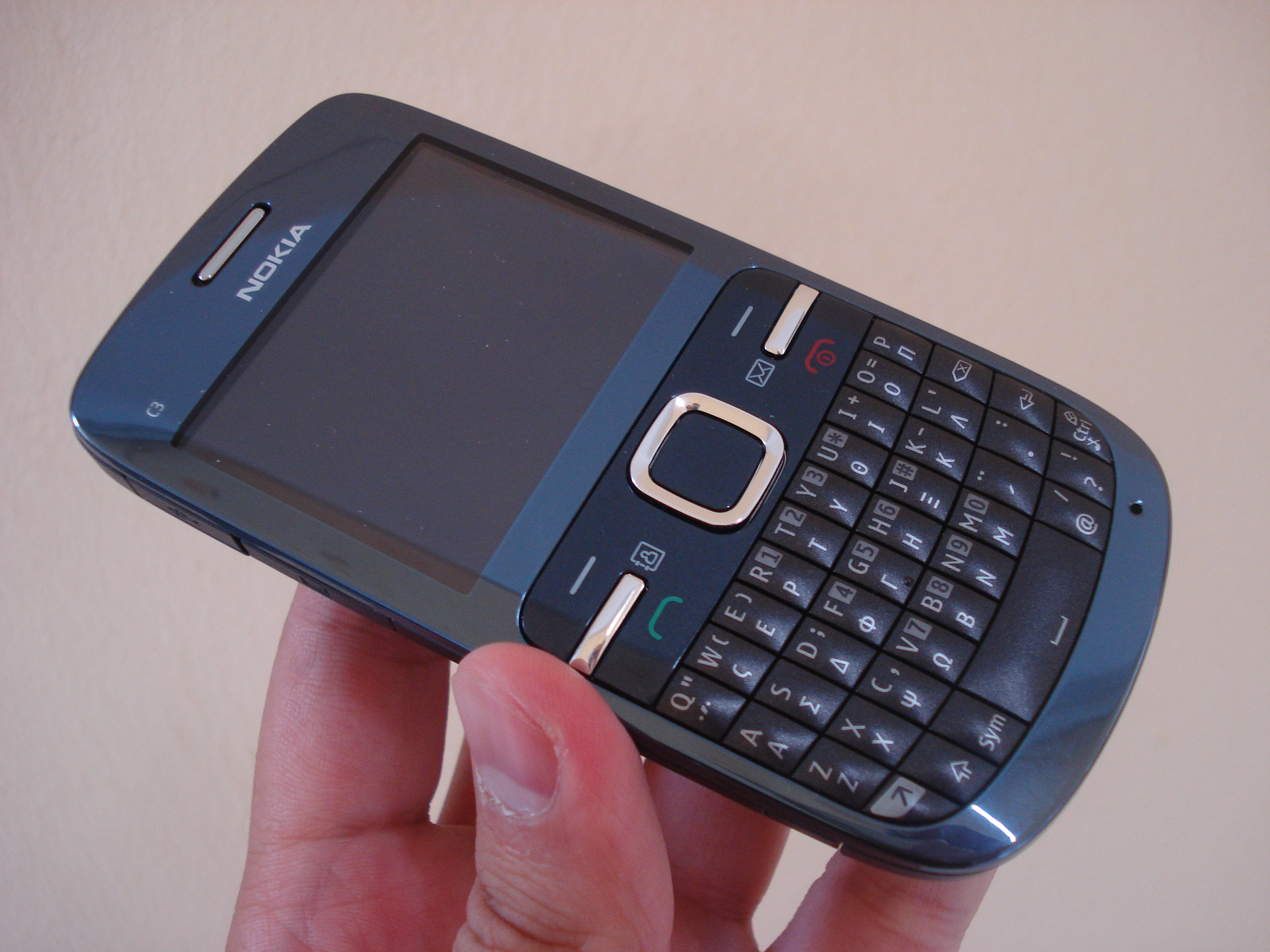
Nokia C3-00 from 2010

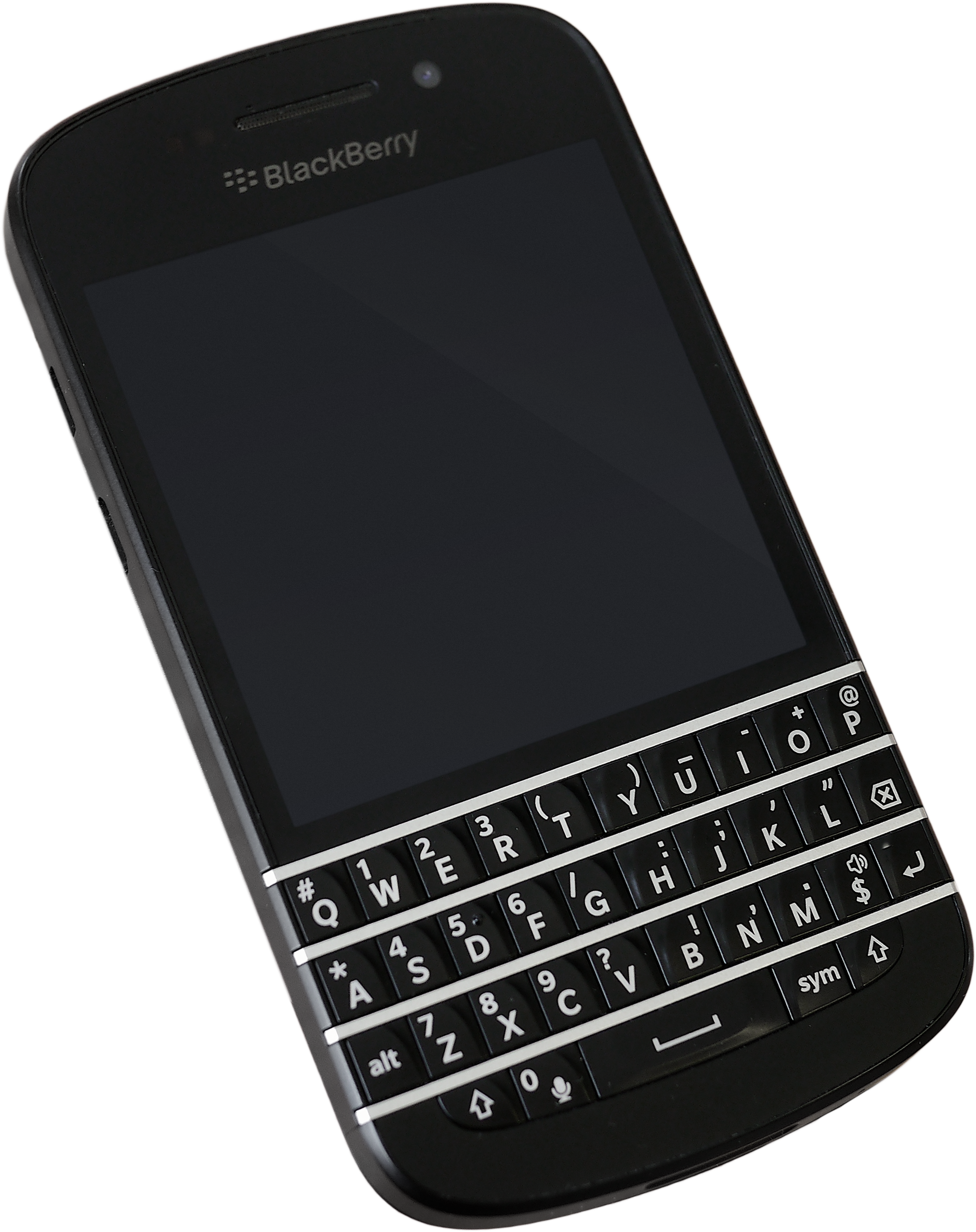
BlackBerry Q10, released 2013

=== Brick ===
"Brick" is a slang term used to refer to large, outdated rectangular phones, typically early devices with large batteries and electronics. These early phones, such as the Motorola DynaTAC, have been displaced by newer smaller models which offer greater portability thanks to smaller antennas and slimmer battery packs.

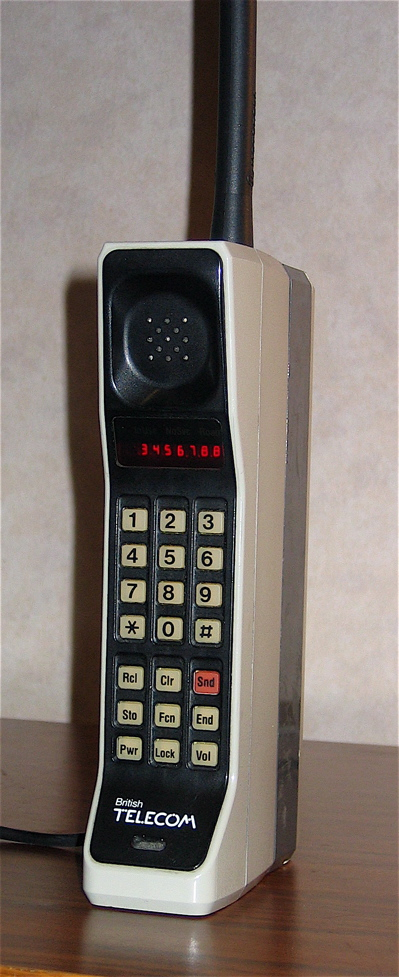
A Motorola DynaTAC 8000X, a brick phone from 1984

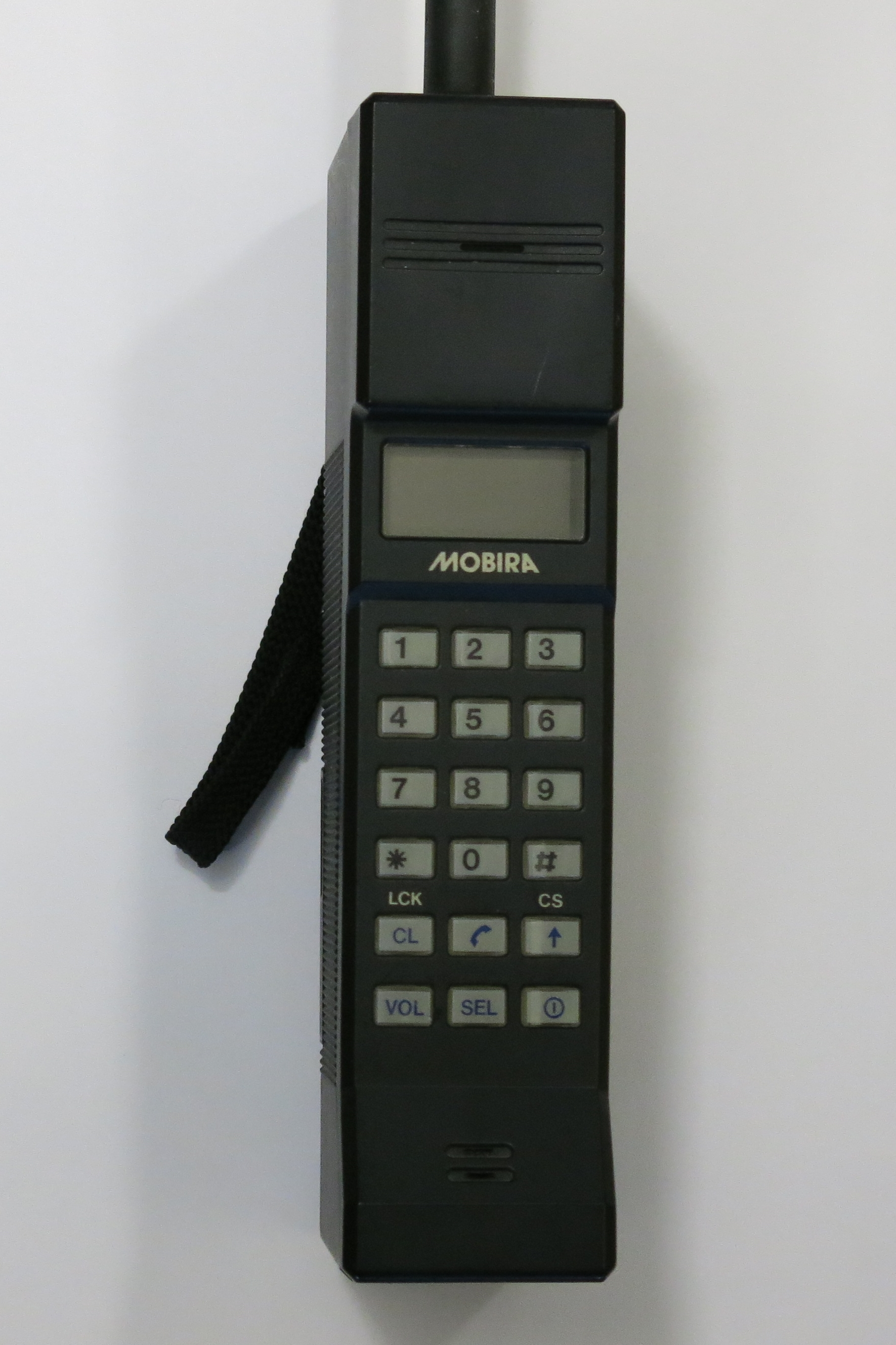
A Mobira Cityman 450, a brick phone from 1985

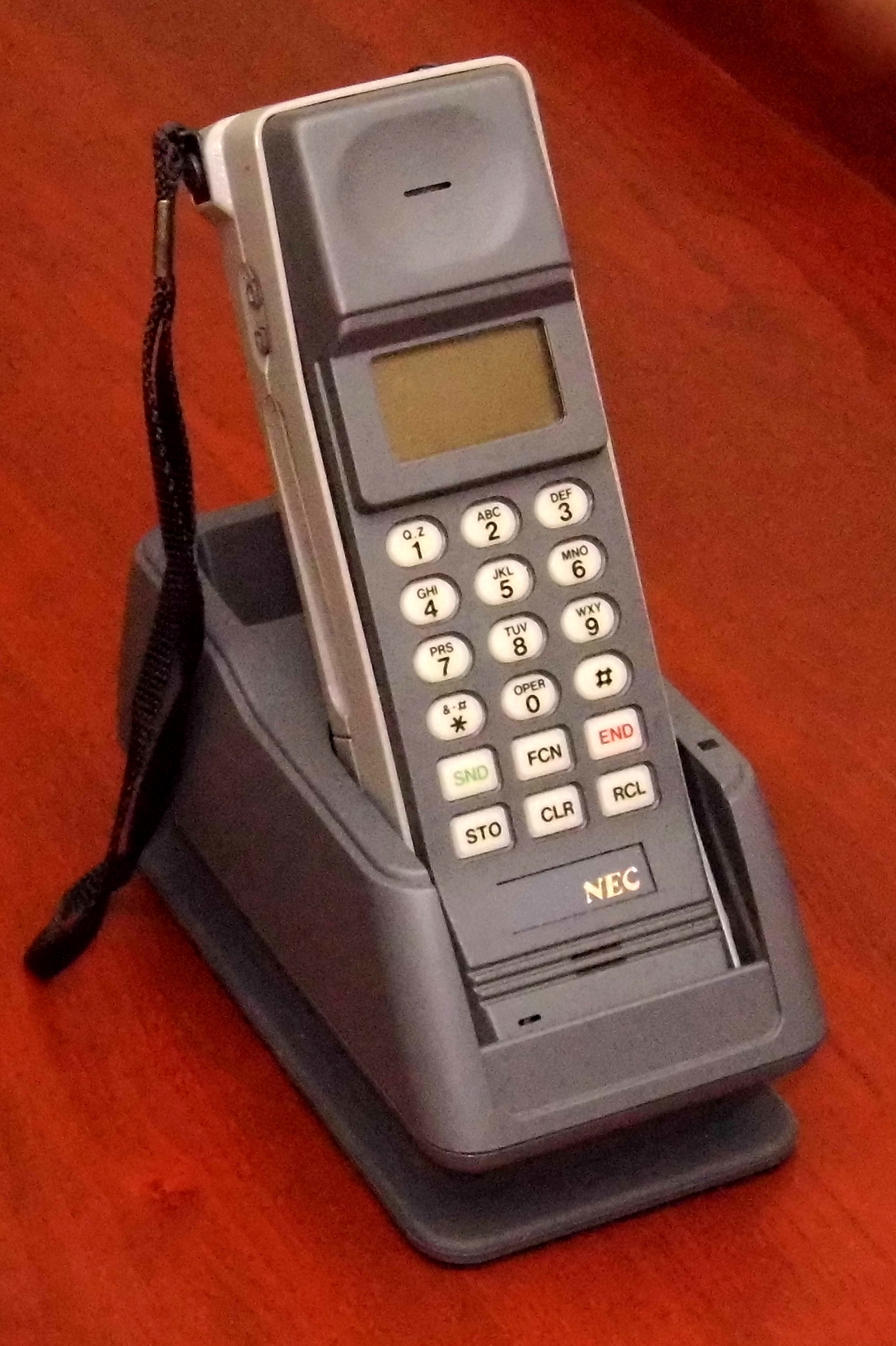
NEC P9100, a Japanese brick from 1988

However, "brick" has more recently been applied to older phone models in general, including non-bar form factors (flip, slider, swivel, etc.), and even early touchscreen phones as well, due to their size and relative lack of functionality compared to current models on the market.

The term "brick" has also expanded beyond smartphones to include most non-working consumer electronics, including a game console, router, or other device, that, due to a serious misconfiguration, corrupted firmware, or a hardware problem, can no longer function, hence, is as technologically useful as a brick. The term derives from the vaguely cuboid shape of many electronic devices (and their detachable power supplies) and the suggestion that the device can function only as a lifeless, square object, paperweight or doorstop. This term is commonly used as a verb. For example, "I bricked my MP3 player when I tried to modify its firmware." It can also be used as a noun, for example, "If it's corrupted and you apply using fastboot, your device is a brick." In the common usage of the term, "bricking" suggests that the damage is so serious as to have rendered the device permanently unusable.

=== Slate ===
A slate is a smartphone form with few to no physical buttons, instead relying on a touchscreen and an onscreen virtual keyboard for input. The first commercially available touchscreen phone was a brick phone, the IBM Simon Personal Communicator, released in 1994. The success of the iPhone, which was released by Apple in 2007, is considered by some to be largely responsible for the influence and achievement of this design.

Some unusual "slate" designs include that of LG New Chocolate (BL40), or the Samsung Galaxy Round, which is curved.

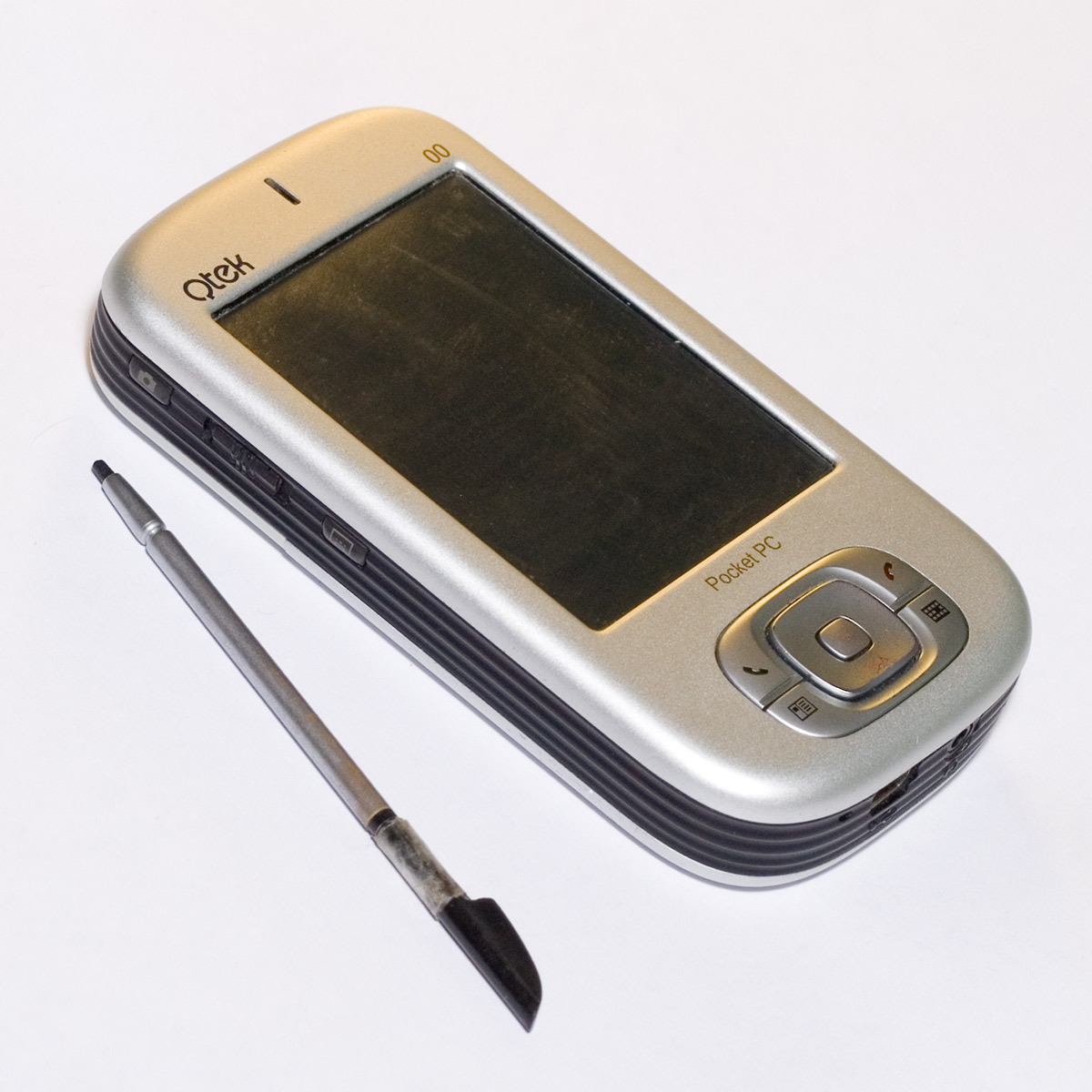
HTC Magician, a pre-contemporary slate from 2004

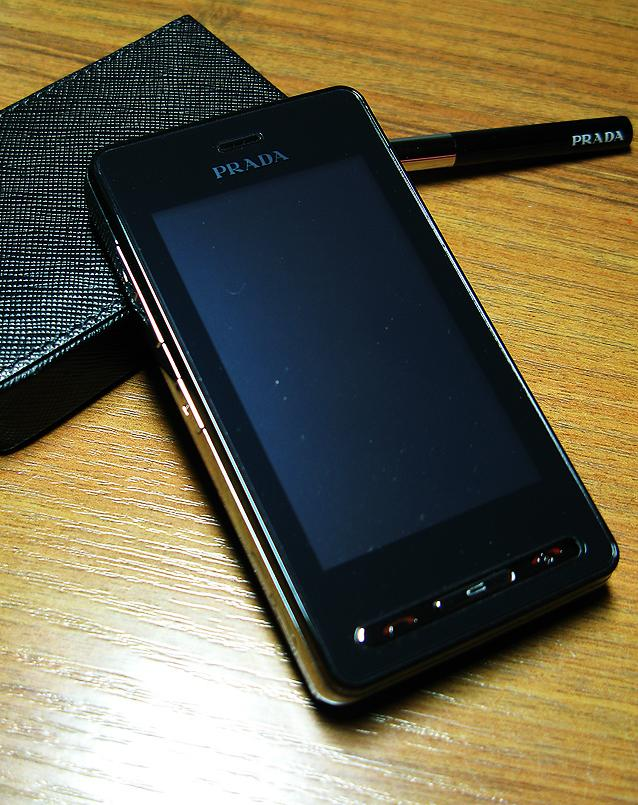
LG Prada, a slate phone from 2006

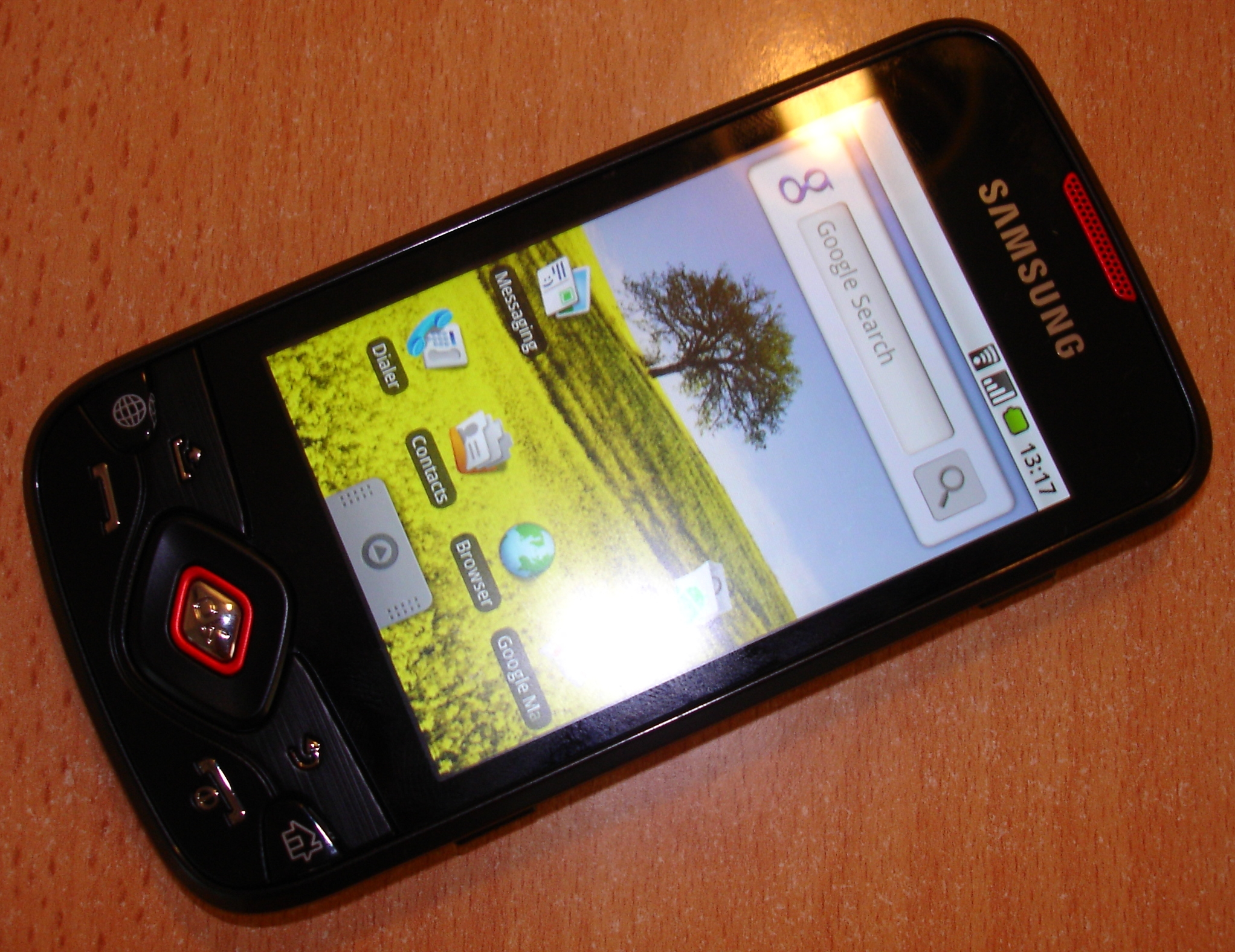
Samsung Galaxy Spica slate from 2009

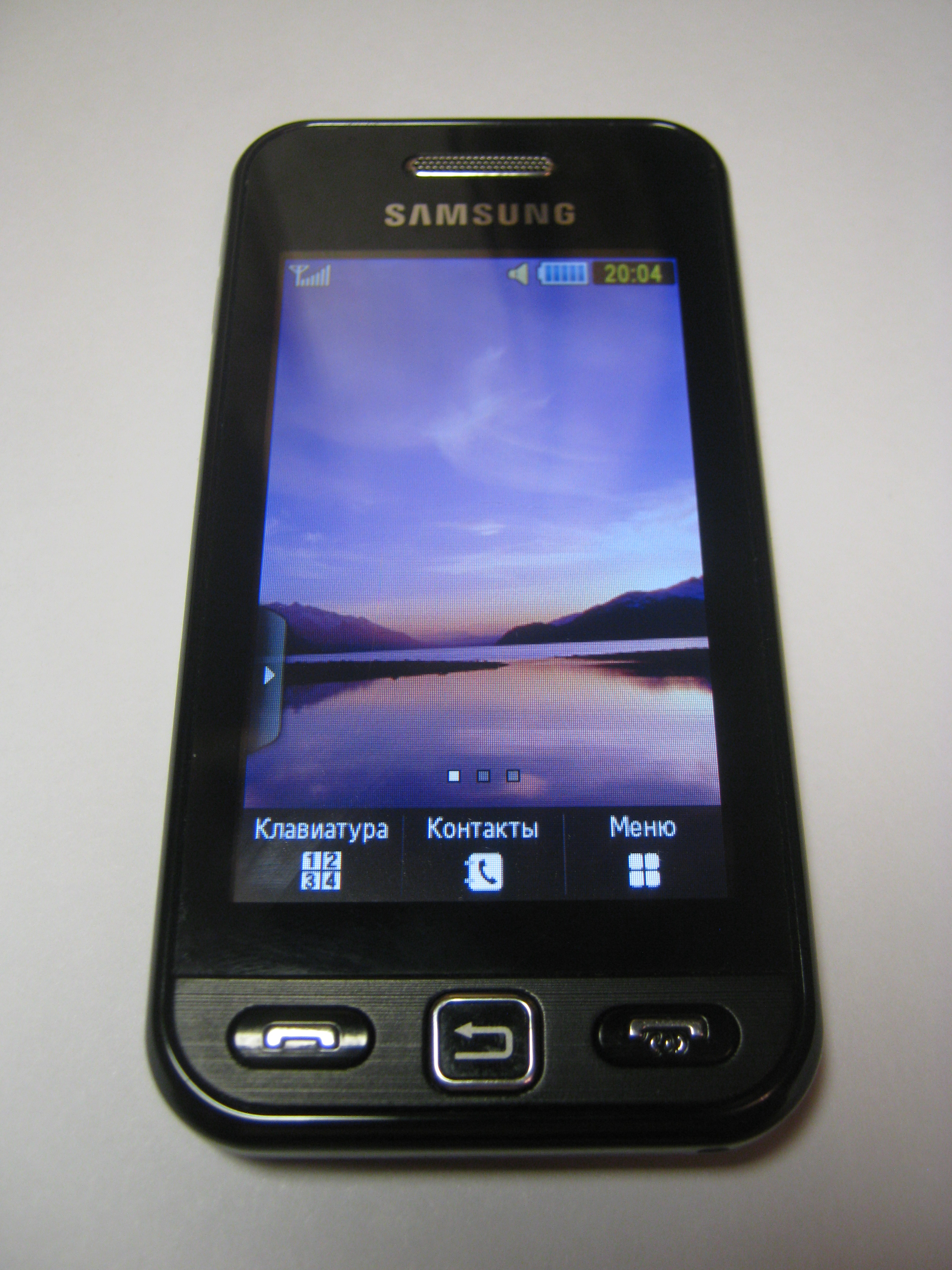
Samsung GT-S5230 slate from 2009

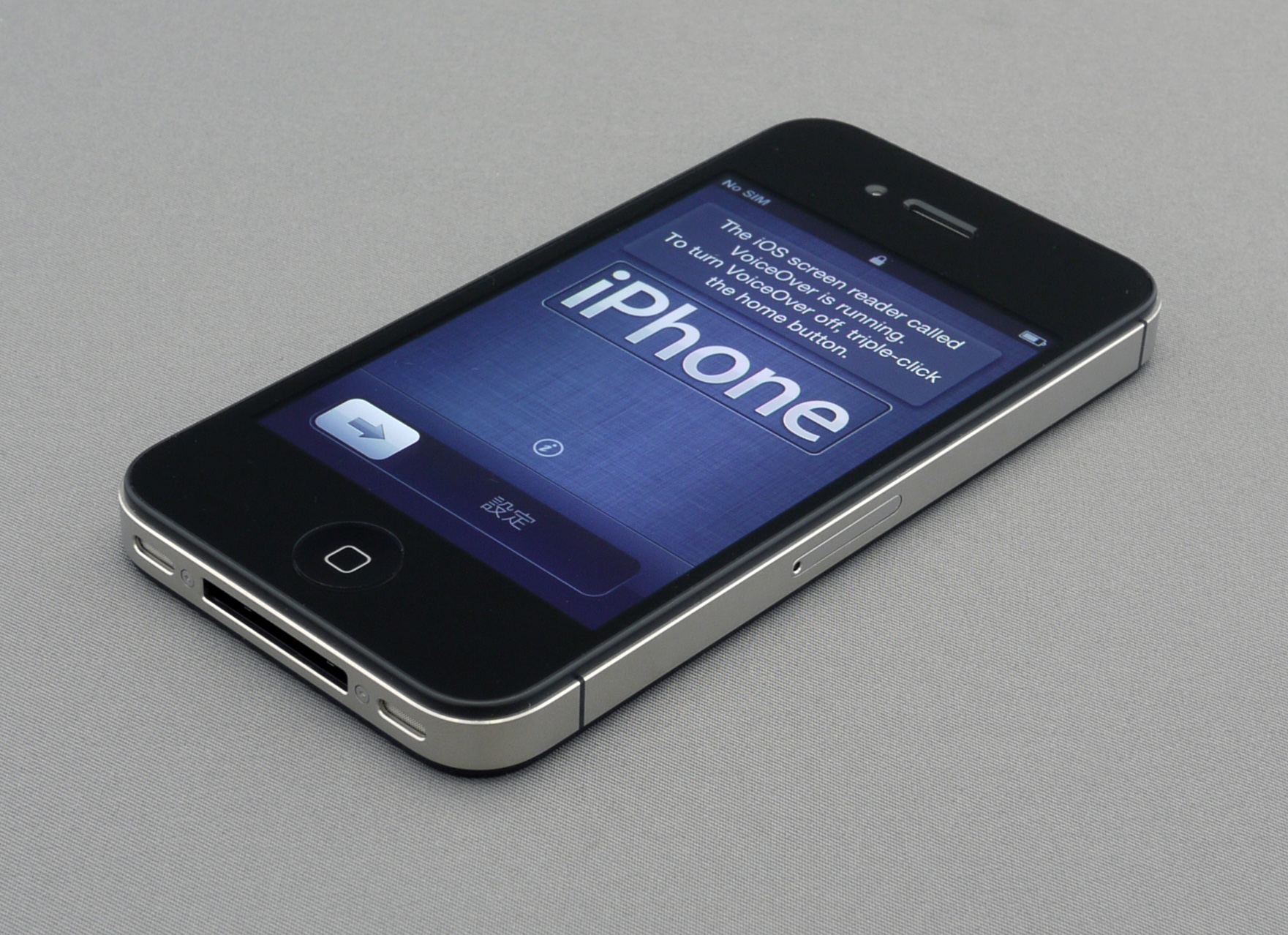
An iPhone 4S, a slate phone from 2011

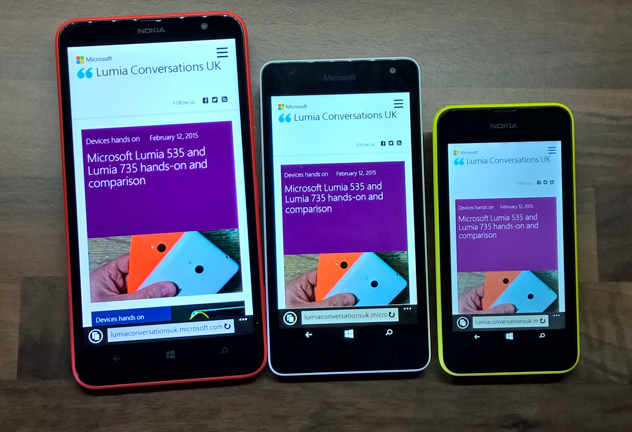
A set of Nokia/Microsoft Lumia slate smartphones

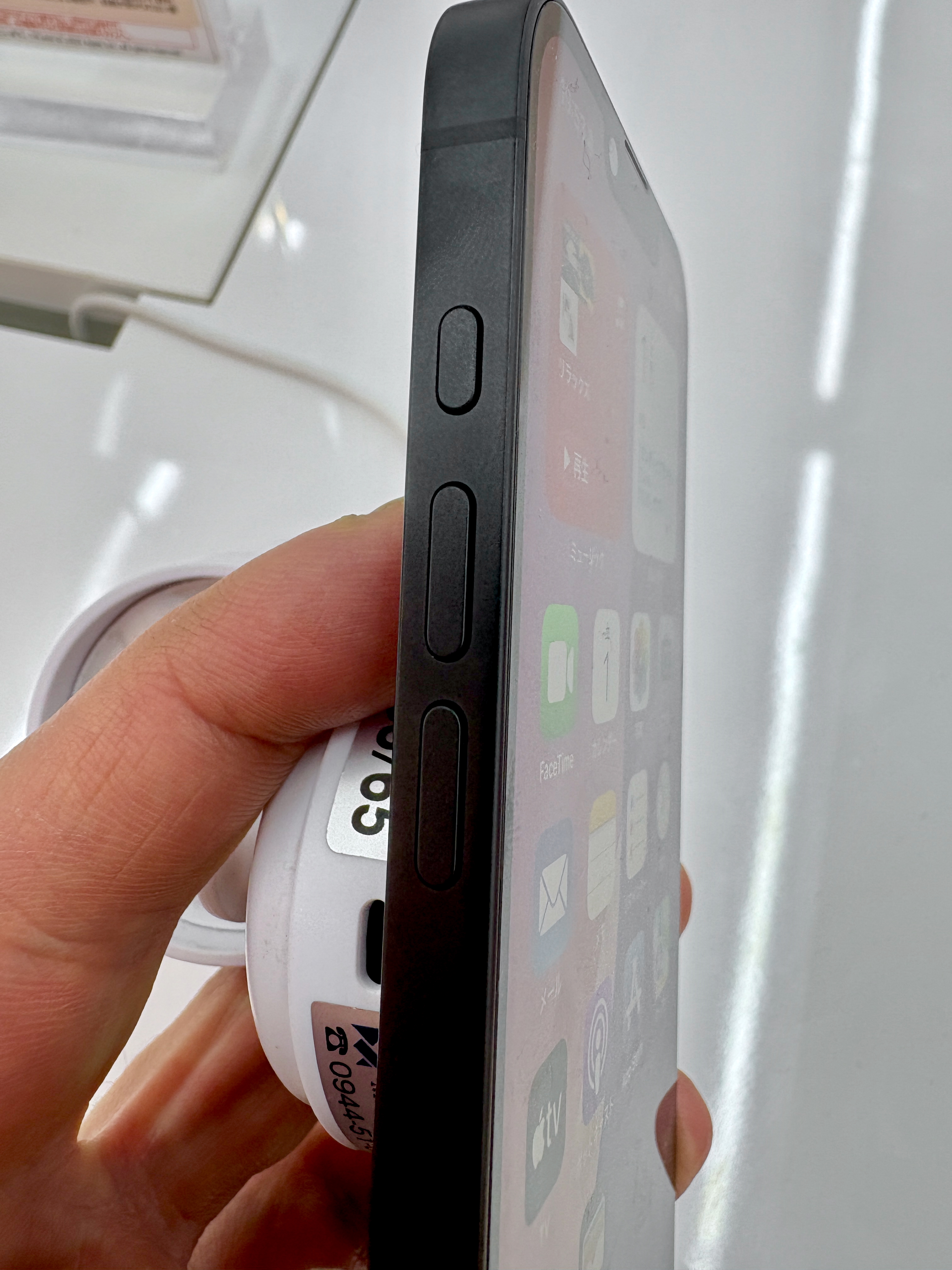
iPhone 16e; a modern slate design

==== Phablet ====
The phablet is a subset of the slate/touchscreen. A portmanteau of the words phone and tablet, phablets are a class of mobile device designed to combine or straddle the size of a slate smartphone together with a tablet. Phablets typically have screens that measure (diagonally) greater than 5.3 inches, and are considerably larger than most high-end slate smartphones of the time (i.e. the Samsung Galaxy Note II smartlet versus the Samsung Galaxy S III smartphone), which have to be 5.2 inches or less to be known as a smartphone, though significantly smaller than tablets (which must be 7 inches or above to be considered as such).

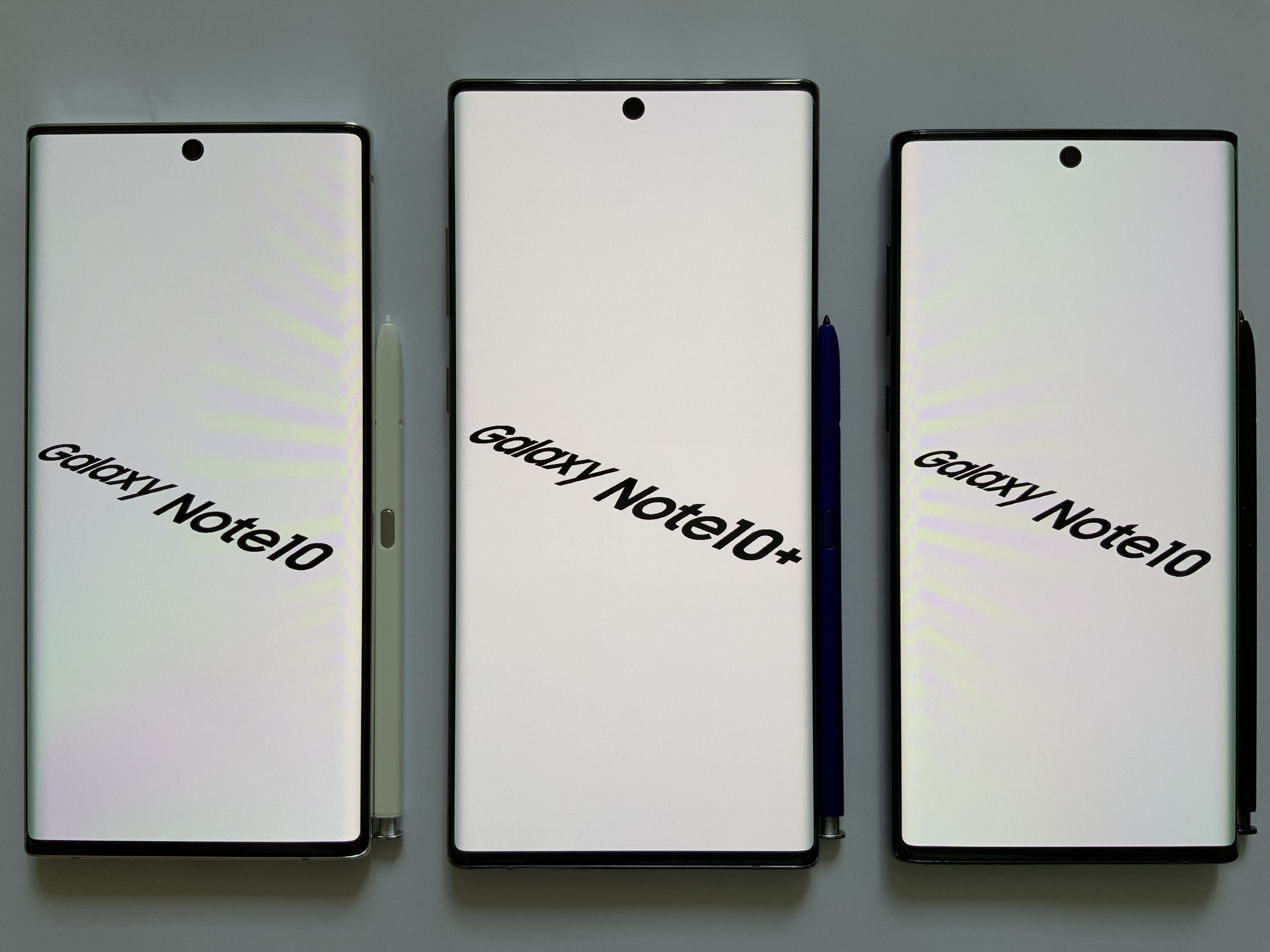
Samsung Galaxy Note 10, a modern Android phablet

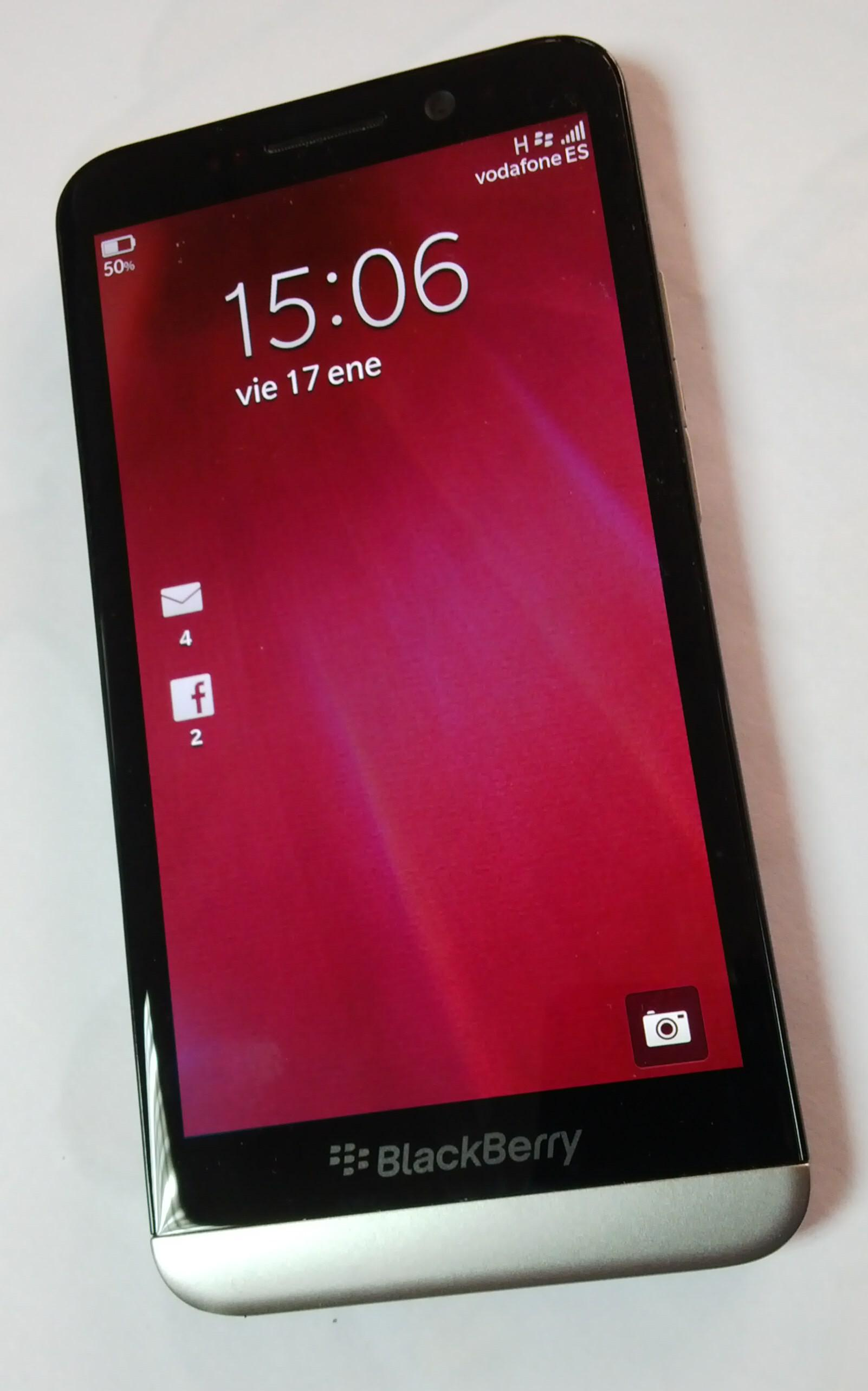
BlackBerry Z30, a BlackBerry 10 touchscreen smartphone

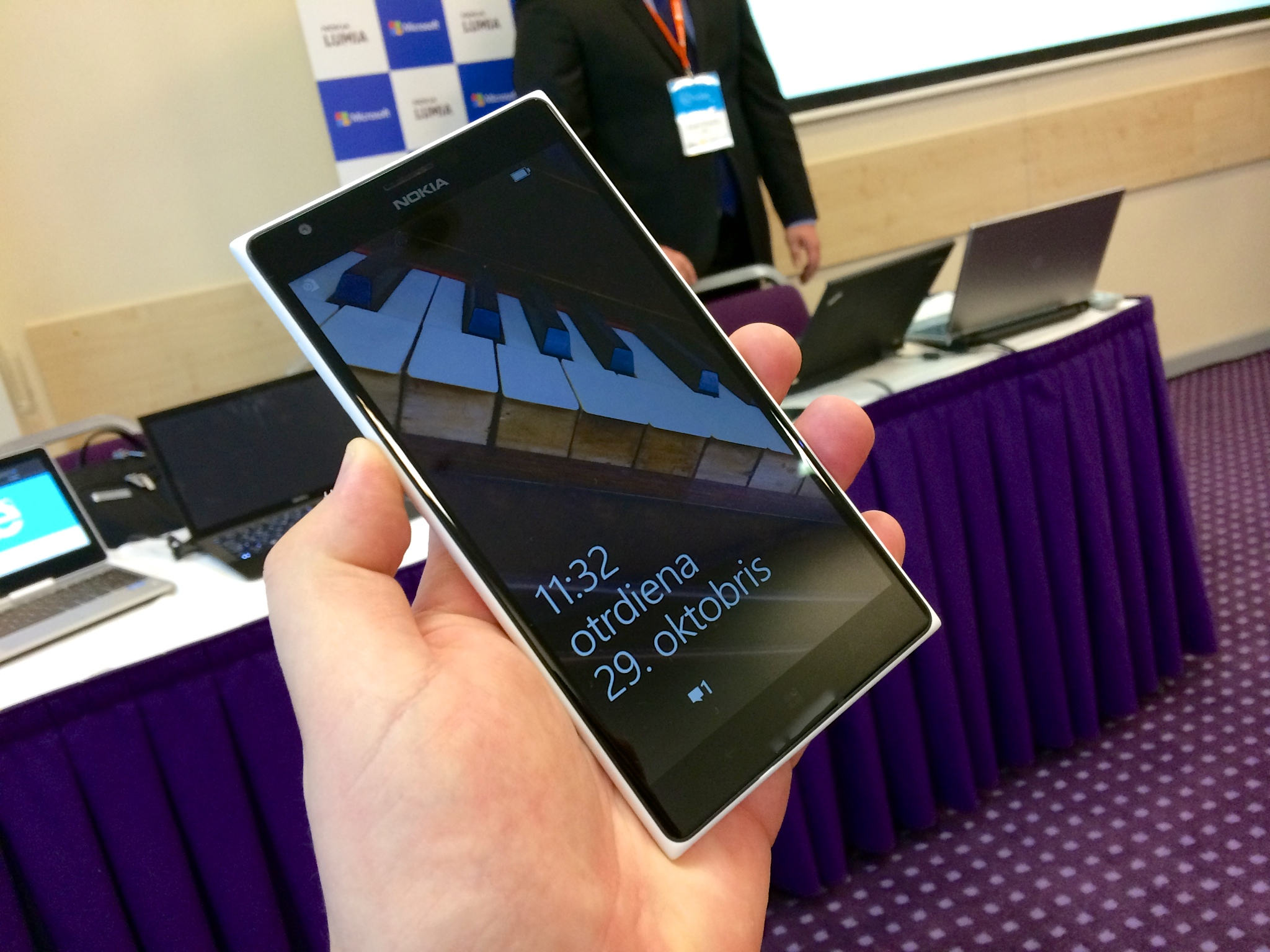
Nokia Lumia 1520, a Windows Phone phablet

==== Multi-screen ====
The multi-screen is of basically the slate form factor, but with two touchscreens.

Some have a small separate screen above the main screens, the LG V10 and LG V20.

Other multi-screen form factors has screens on both sides of the phone. In the case of Yotaphone and Siam 7X, they have normal touchscreens on the front, but on the backside is an e-ink screen, which enables using the cases in a fashion similar to reading a book.

The presence of the front camera for taking selfies has been an essential feature in smartphones; however, it is difficult to achieve a bezelless screen, as was the trend in the later 2010s. The Nubia X, Nubia Z20 and Vivo NEX Dual Display have solved this, combining the use of the main camera and a smaller second rear screen, eliminating the front camera.

==== Wrapped-around display ====
Xiaomi revealed Mi MIX Alpha, a smartphone with a display that surrounds almost entirely its body, only interrupted in the back part by a column that contains the cameras. Back part of display can be used as viewfinder for selfies and videocalls.

=== Taco ===
The taco form factor was popularized by the Nokia N-Gage, released in 2003 as a combination phone and game console. It was widely known as the plastic taco for its "D" shape, with speaker placement that required holding it awkwardly on edge against the face. Other models include Nokia 3300 and Nokia 5510.

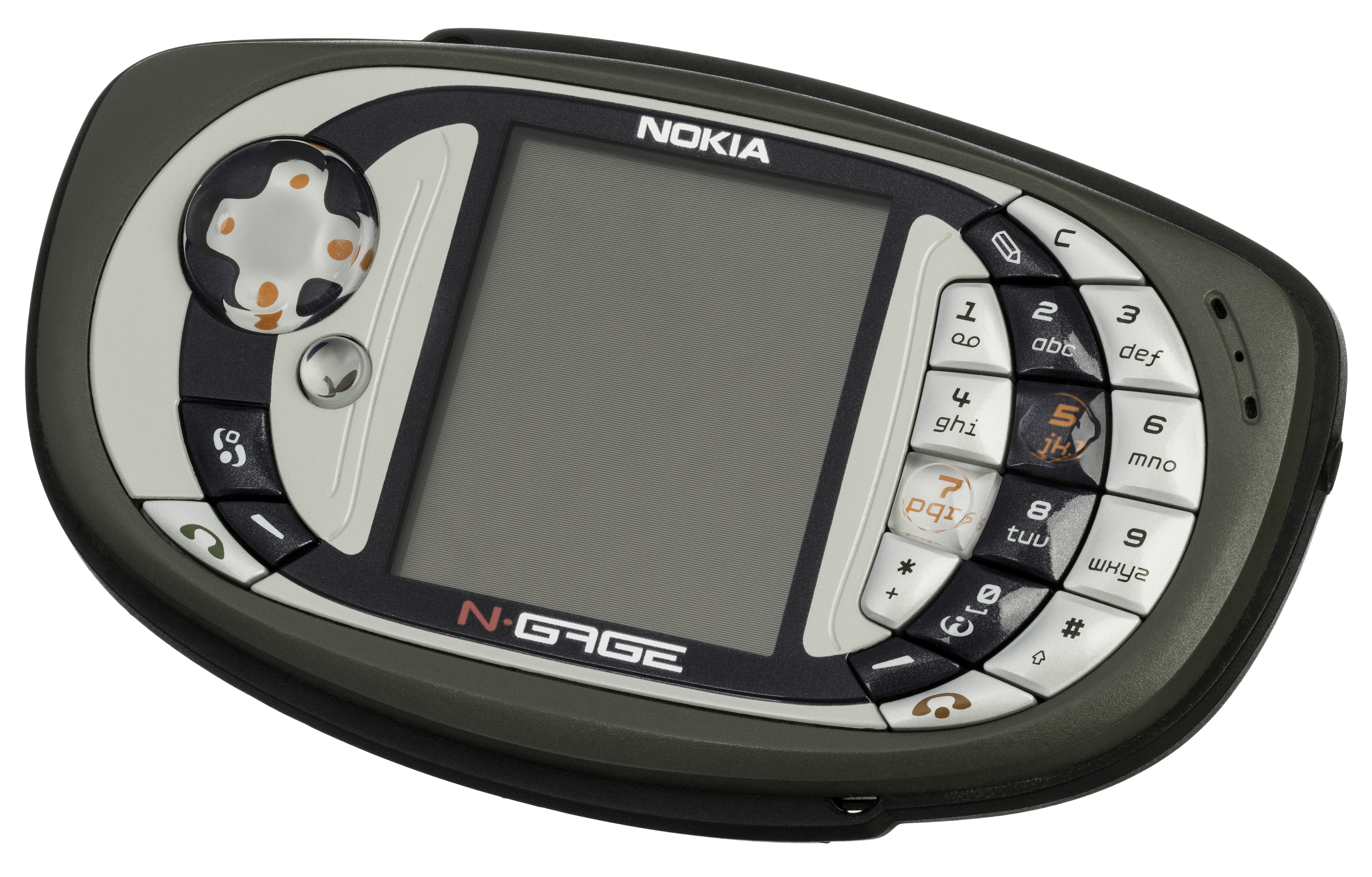
N-Gage QD

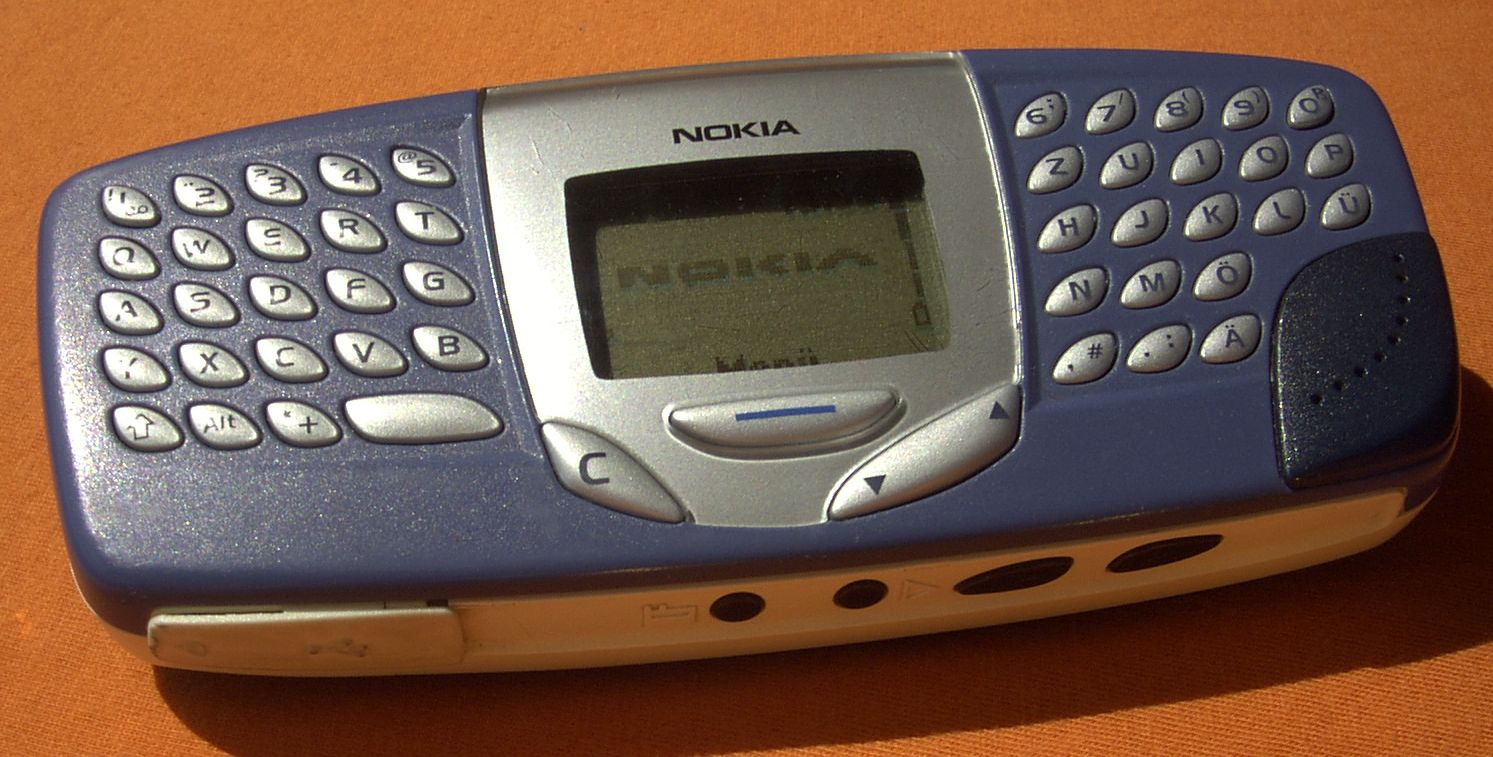
Nokia 5510

=== Wearables ===
==== Smartwatch ====
A smartphone in the form of a wristwatch is typically referred to as a smartwatch.

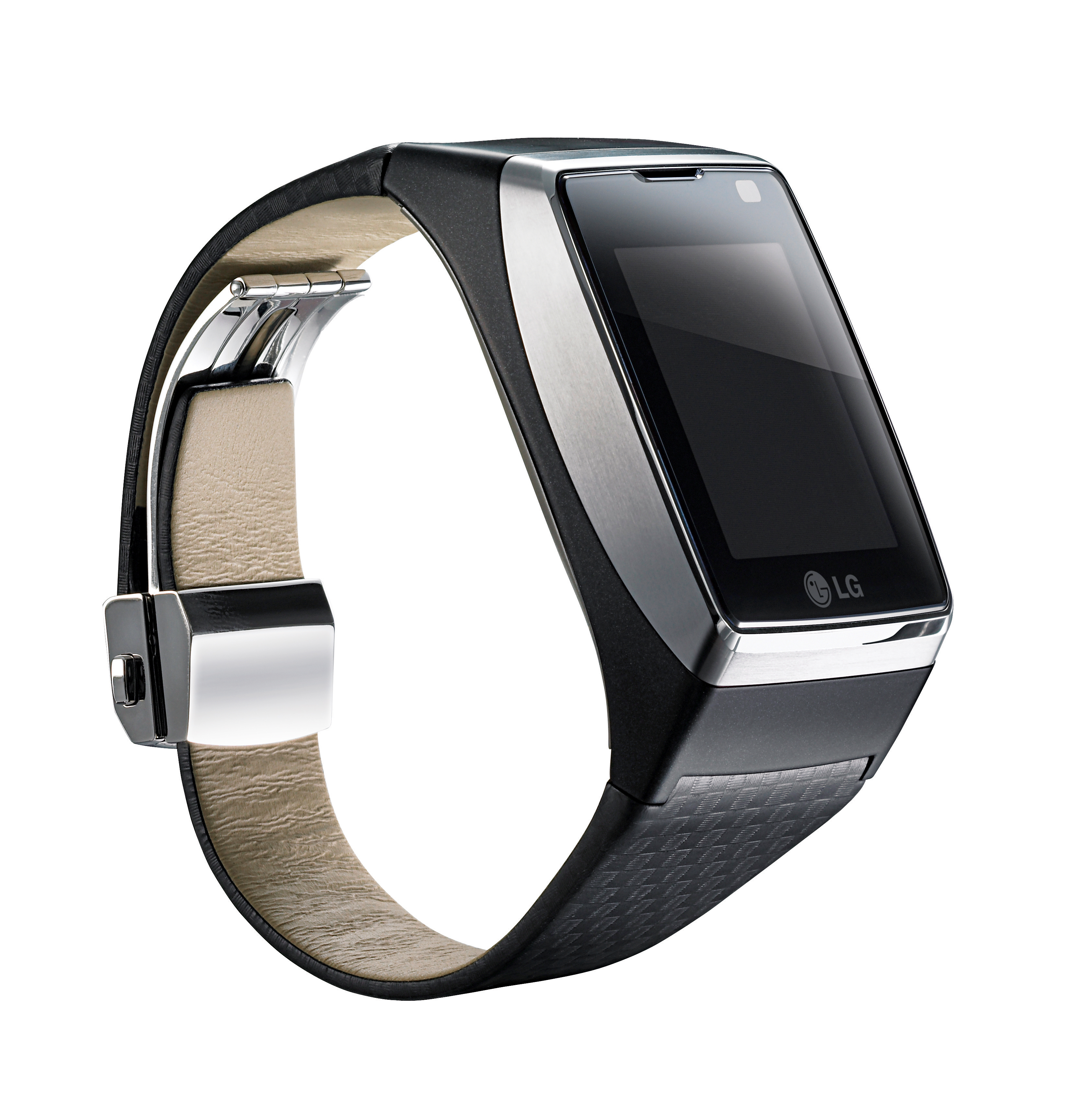
The LG GD910 watch phone from 2009

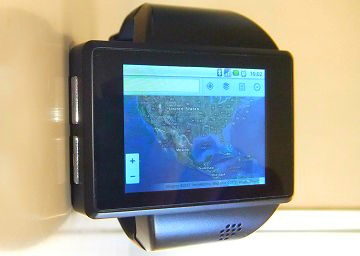
The Z1 Android watch phone, smartphone in the form of a wristwatch

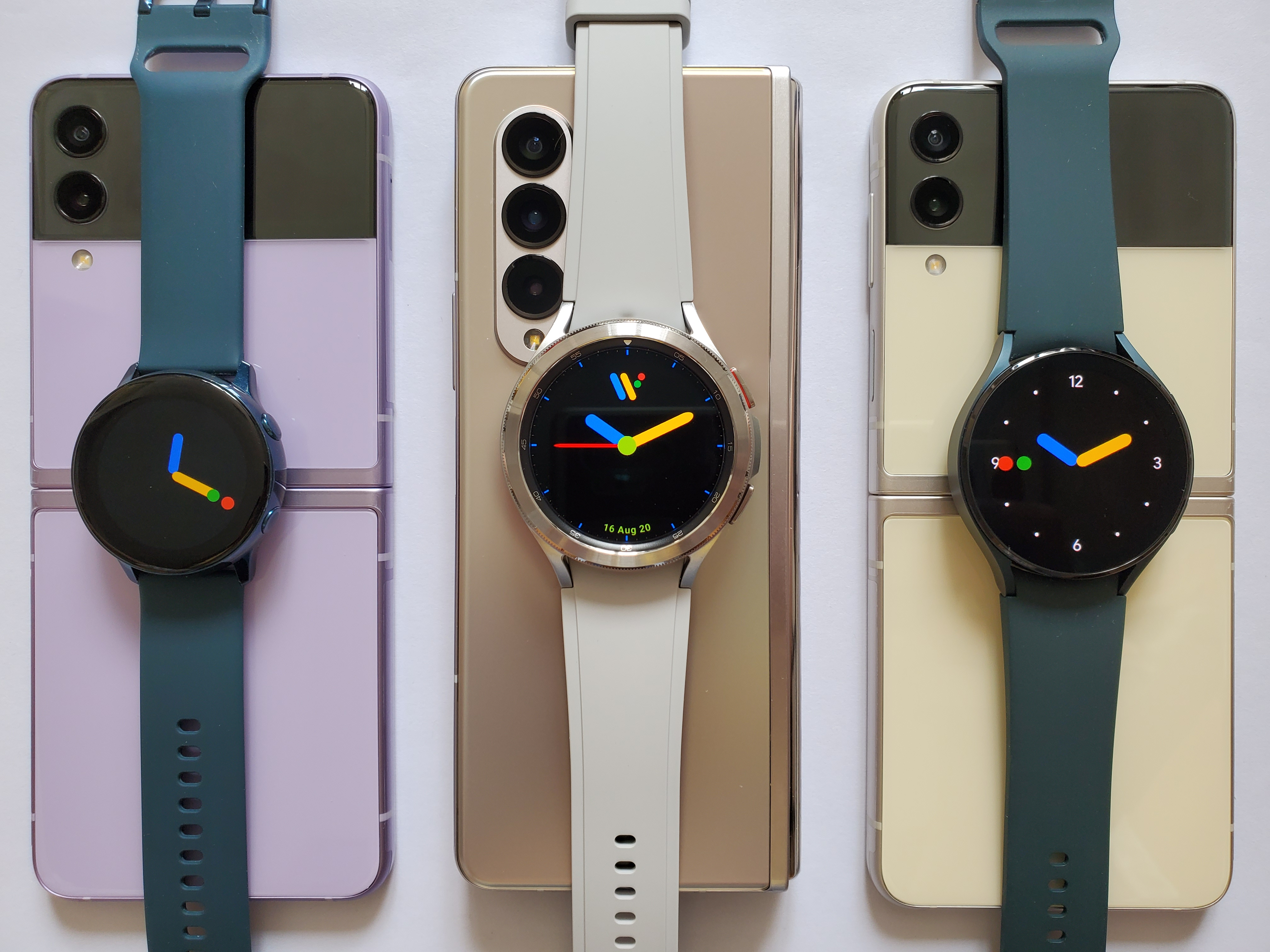
The Samsung Galaxy Watches, paired by Bluetooth with smartphones

== With movable sections ==
=== Clamshell / Flip ===
A flip or clamshell phone consists of two or more sections that are connected by hinges, allowing the phone to flip open then fold closed in order to become more compact. Clamshell came to be used as generic for this form factor. Flip phone referred to phones that opened on the vertical axis (as clamshells disappeared from the market, the terms again became disambiguated). Flip began achieving widespread popularity around 2001 and by the mid-2000s, "flip" designs reached the peak of their availability and declined afterward, being replaced by sliders which in turn were completely replaced by slate smartphones. Precedents for this form factor can be found in designs such as the Star Trek communicator and the Grillo telephone, both from the mid-1960s.

Motorola was once owner of a trademark for the term flip phone, but the term flip phone has become genericized and used more frequently than clamshell in colloquial speech. Motorola was the manufacturer of the famed StarTAC flip phone in the 1990s, as well as the RAZR in the mid-2000s. In these styles, when flipped open, the phone's screen and keyboard are available. When flipped shut, the phone becomes much smaller and more portable than when it is opened for use. On most modern flip phones, there is usually a small display on the back of the screen to indicate the time and any incoming calls/text messages whilst the phone is closed.

There were also flip "down" phones, like the Motorola MicroTAC series and was also widely used by Ericsson. Originally these were called "flip" phones in the 1990s, while what is now known as "flip phone" used to be called "folding" or "folder" phones.

In 2010, Motorola introduced a different kind of flip phone with its Backflip smartphone. When closed, one side is the screen and the other is a physical QWERTY keyboard. The hinge is on a long edge of the phone instead of a short edge, and when flipped out the screen is above the keyboard. Another unusual flip form was seen on the luxury Serene, a partnership between Samsung and Bang & Olufsen. The Nokia Communicator series is also an example of clamshell, but not in the typical "flip phone" style.

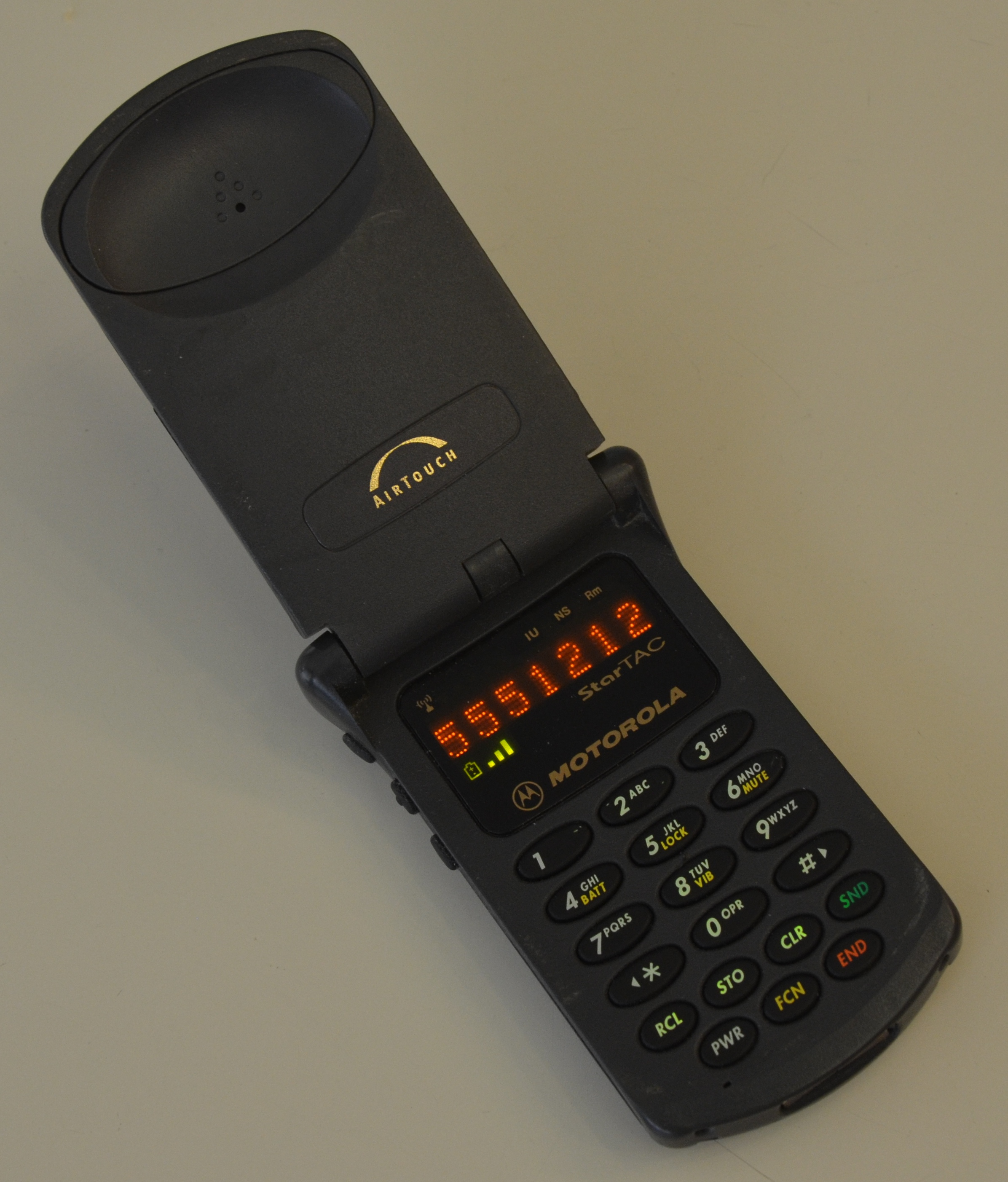
The Motorola StarTAC, the original flip-up phone

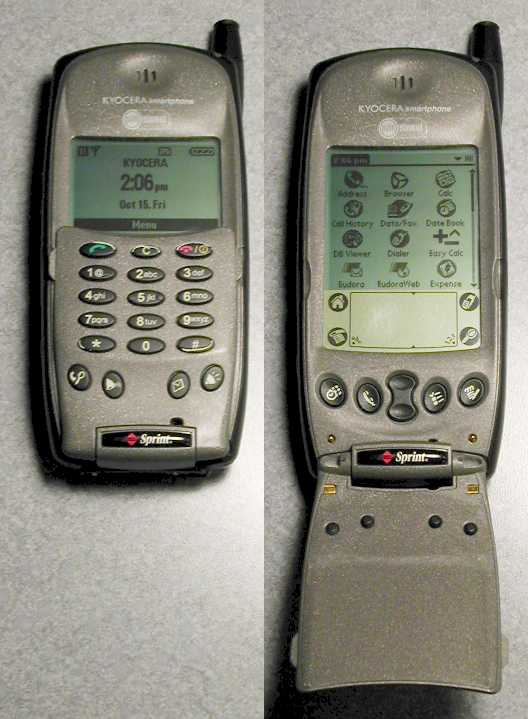
Kyocera 6035 "flip down" phone

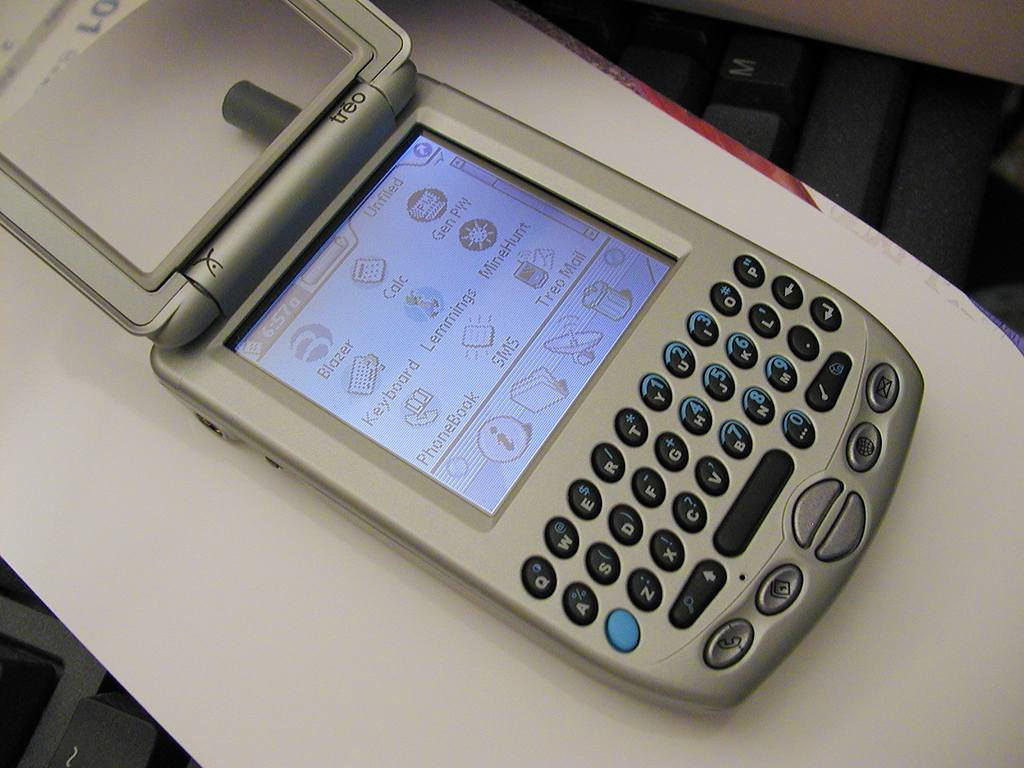
Palm Treo 300, unusual flip-up form

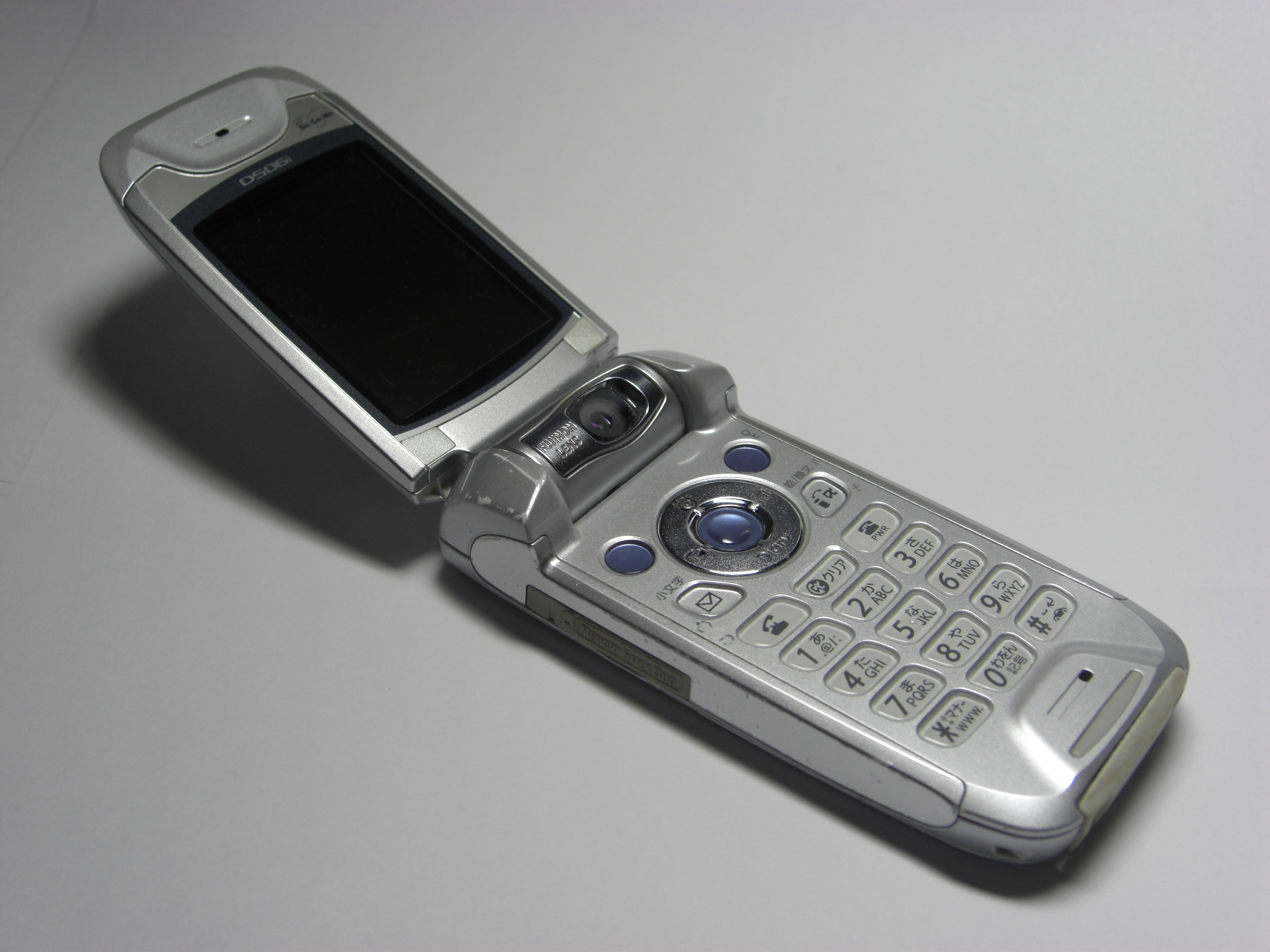
Japanese NTT DoCoMo D506i flip phone manufactured by Mitsubishi

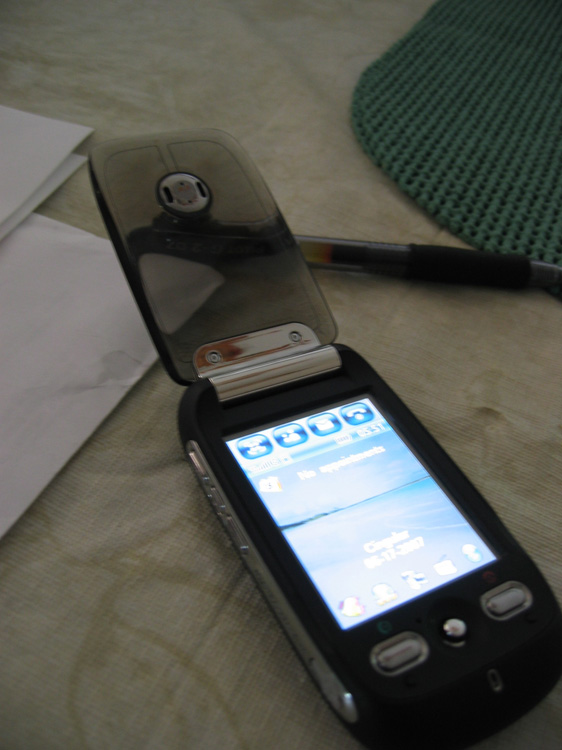
The Motorola Ming, another flip phone

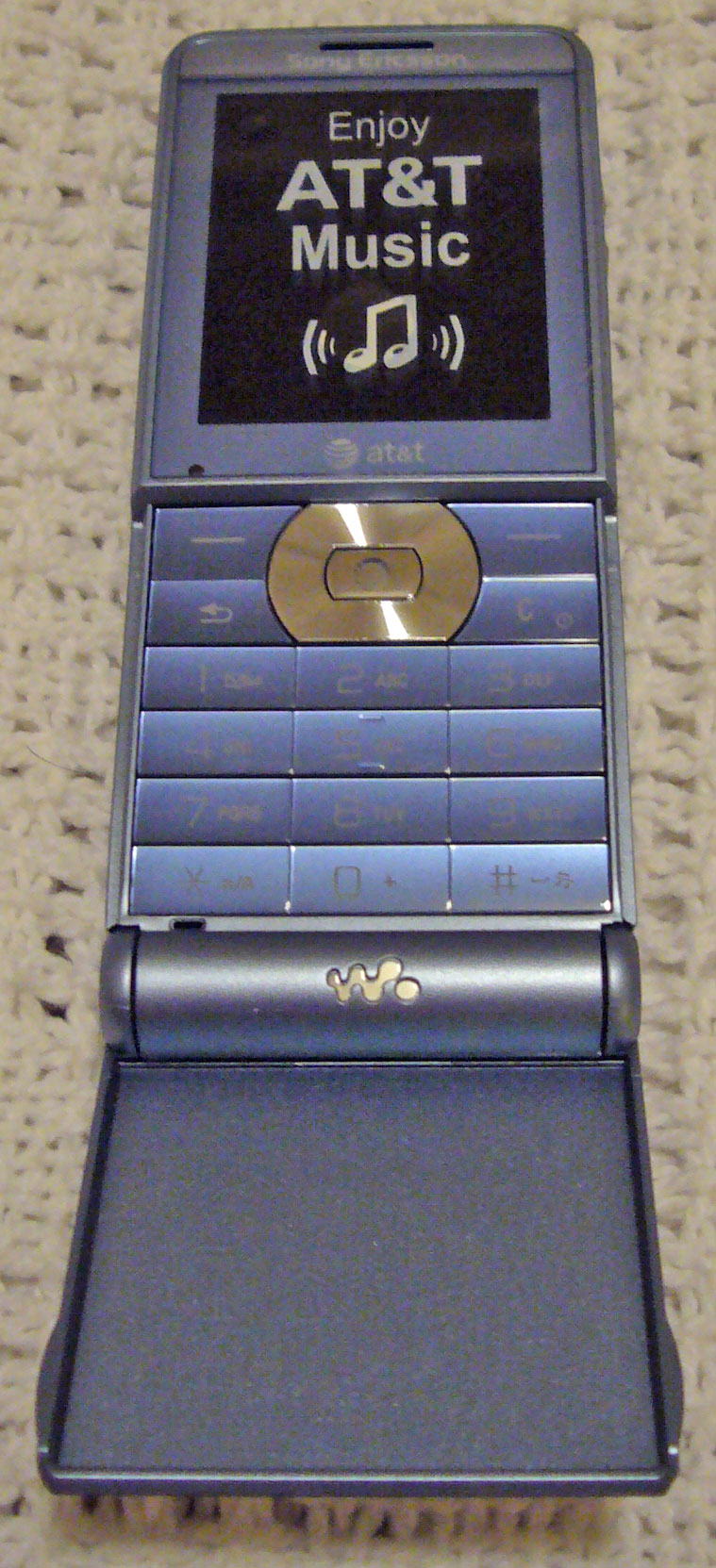
The Sony Ericsson W350, last unusual flip-down phone

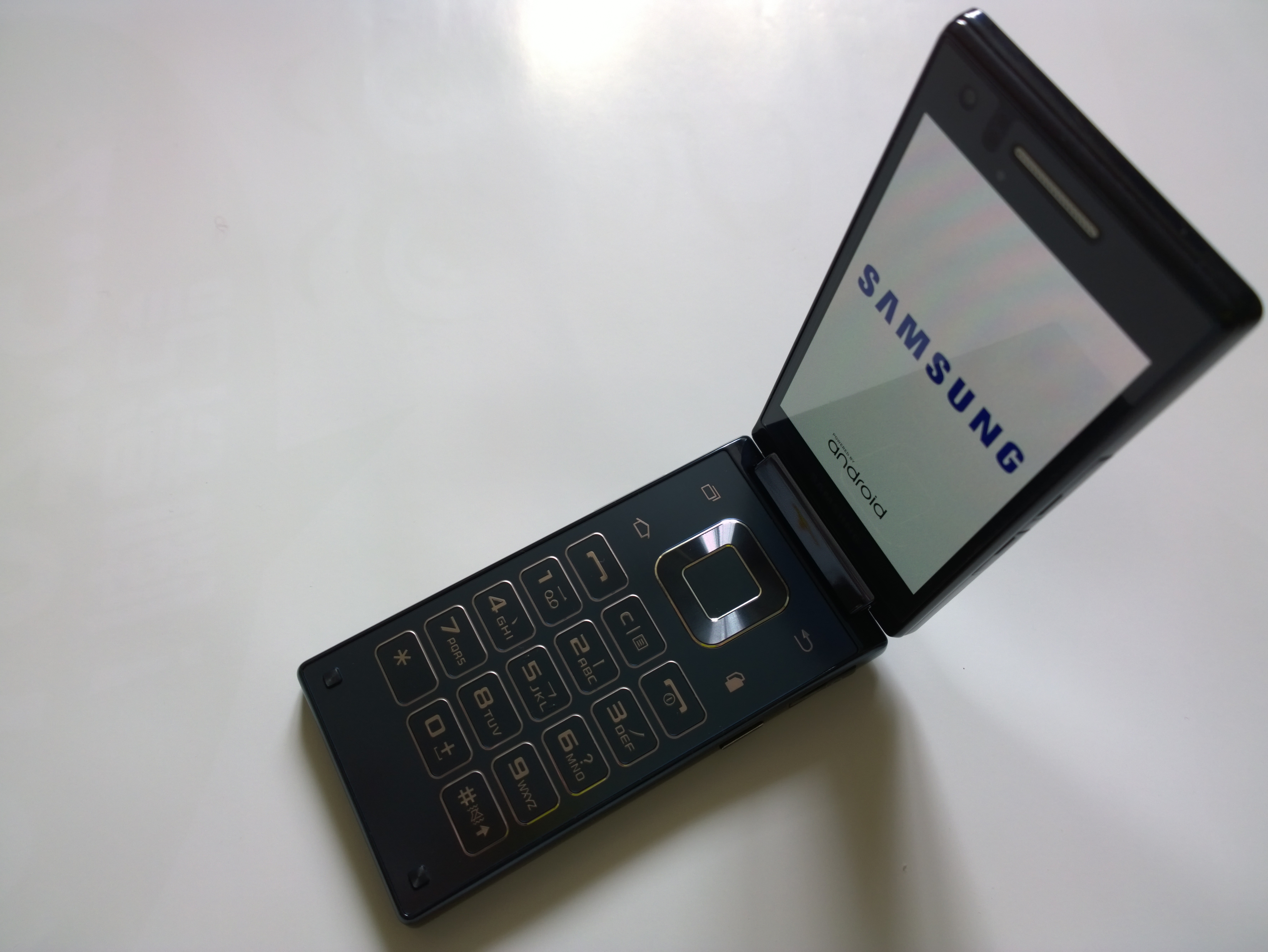
Samsung SM-G9198

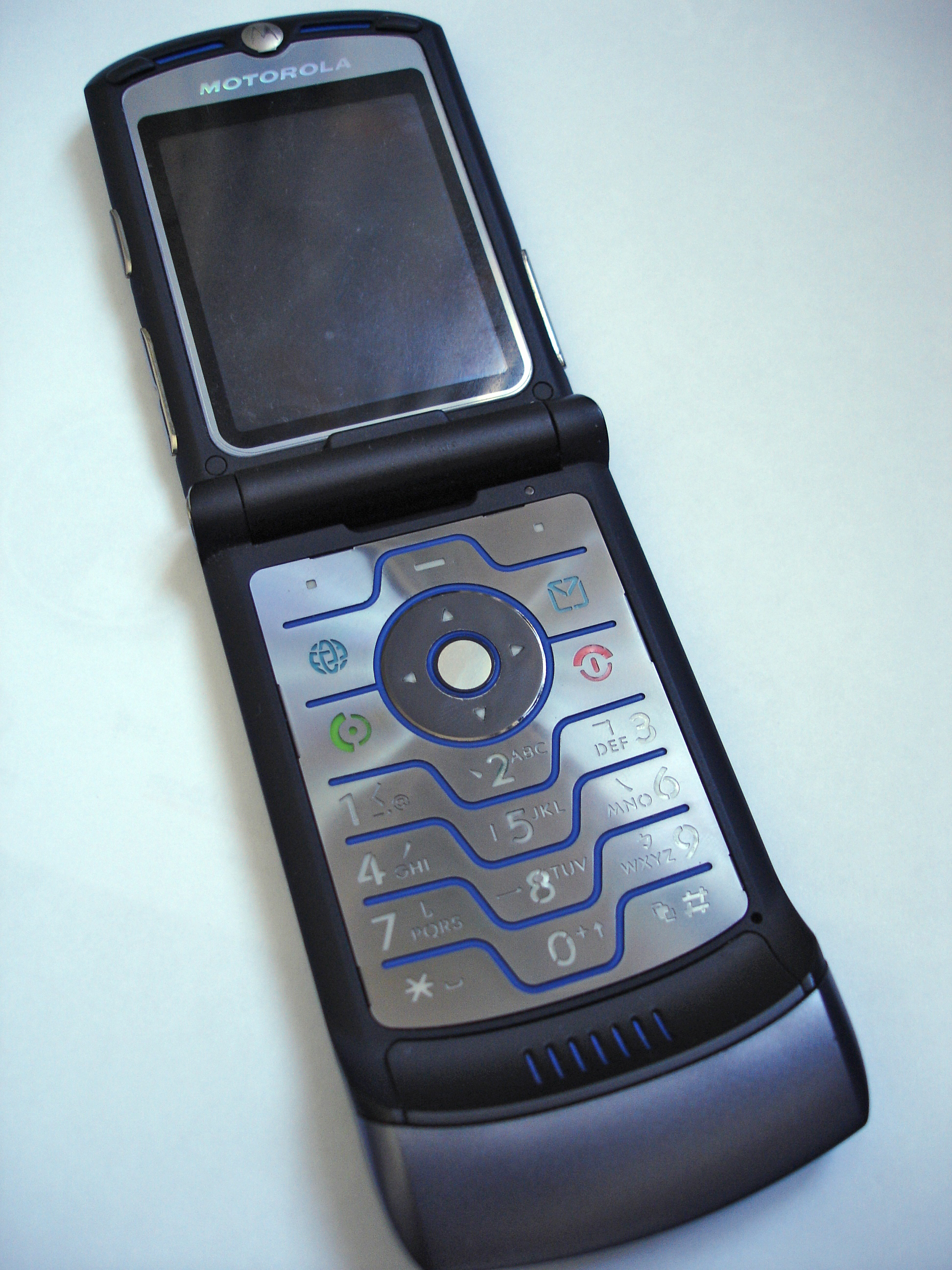
The Motorola Razr from 2004 was the best-selling flip phone in the world.

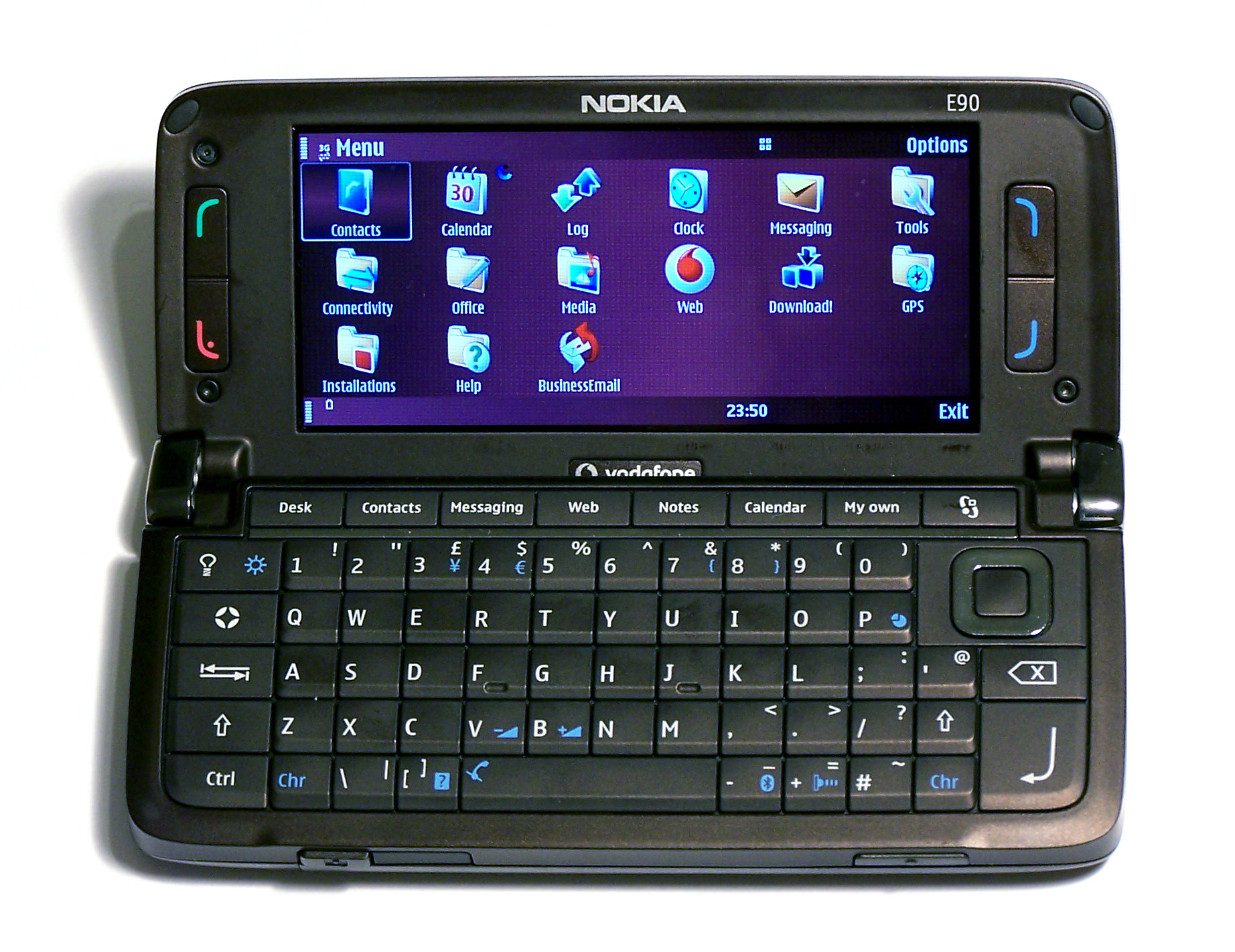
Nokia E90 Communicator

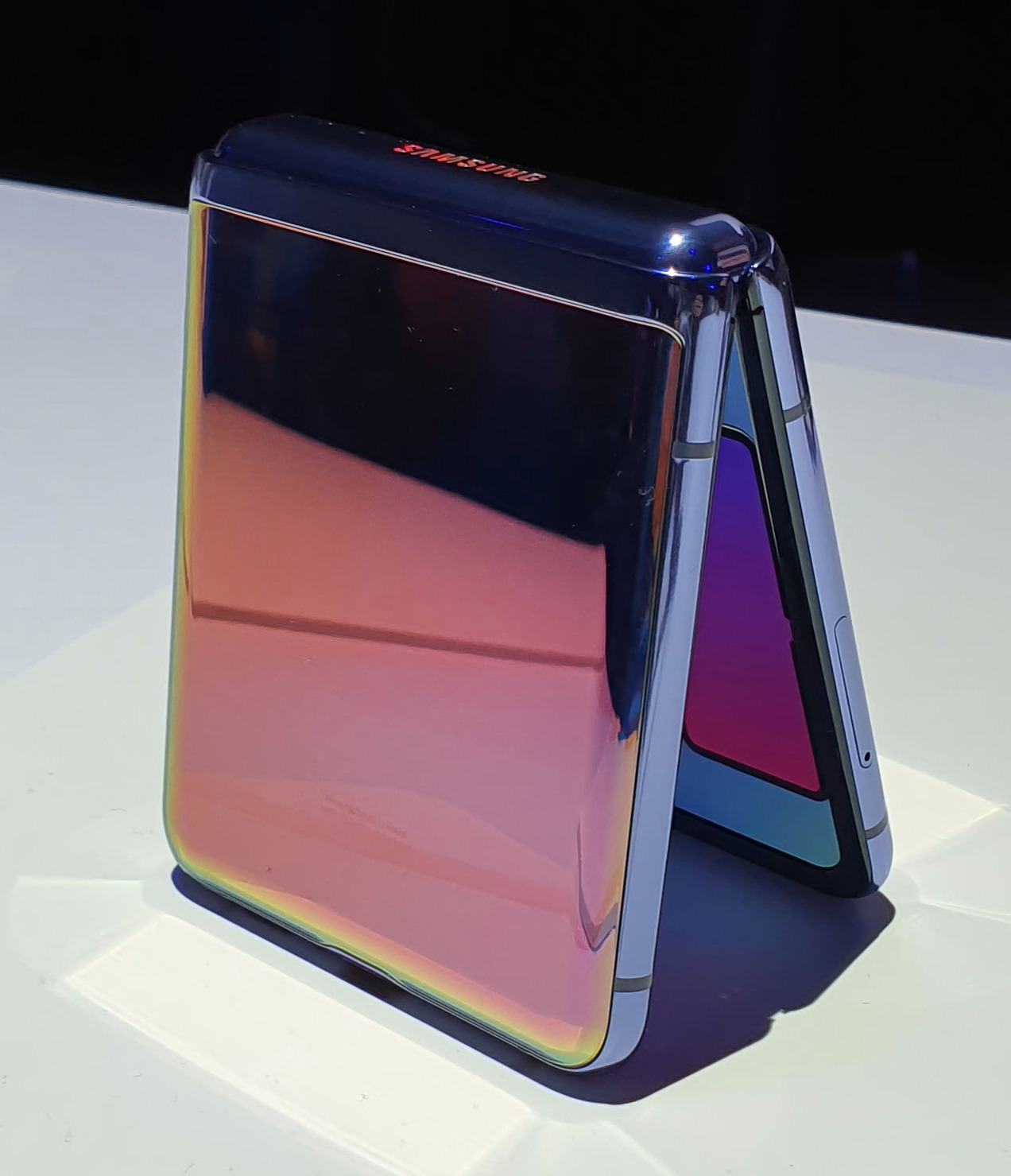
Samsung Galaxy Z Flip, a modern clamshell with fully flexible display (see foldable smartphone)

==== Dual-touchscreen ====
In April 2011, Kyocera International released the Kyocera Echo smartphone with two 3.5" screens. The phone's primary display could lie on top of the second display, reducing its size. In November 2017, ZTE announced the Axon M. The screens could fold to either have two forward facing screens, or one forward and one rear facing screen. The combined display size is 6.75-inch when unfolded. The second screen allows the Axon M's single camera to be both rear and forward facing, as well as acting as a kickstand or tripod.

==== Foldable screen ====
Samsung foldable smartphones

Following advances in display technology, OLED screens can now be manufactured on a flexible, plastic substrate, meaning that glass is no longer needed; allowing the displays to be rolled, bent and folded; which makes new form factors possible. In January 2017, rumors emerged of a Samsung foldable phone, and in November 2018, the Samsung Galaxy Fold was revealed, with a combined display size of 7.4 inches. Other manufacturers, such as Huawei, Xiaomi, Oppo and Honor have also announced phones with foldable displays. In November 2019, Motorola officially unveiled its horizontal-folding Motorola Razr. Apple entered the foldable market in 2026 with the iPhone Duo.

==== Flip-up camera ====
Video demonstrating the retracting action of Asus ZenFone 6's flip camera

The Oppo N1 made use of a manual flip camera. Asus, in the Zenfone 6, Zenfone 7 and Zenfone 8 Flip smartphones, includes an all-screen front, eliminating the dedicated front-facing camera notch; instead, the main cameras are housed in a motorized flip-up module that rotates 180 degrees to focus forward. The Samsung Galaxy A80 also has a similar flip-slide camera mechanism.

=== Rollable display ===
Some companies are experimenting with rollable displays in order to make devices that can convert from smartphone to tablet.

=== Slider ===
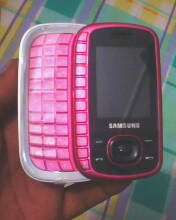
Samsung GT-B3310, an example of a 'side slider' mobile phone

Slider is a general term of a form factor in mobile phones composed of usually two, but sometimes more, sections that slide past each other on rails. Most slider phones have a display segment which houses the device's screen, while another segment contains the keypad or keyboard and slides out for use. The goal of a sliding form factor is to allow the operator to take advantage of full physical keyboards or keypads, without sacrificing portability, by retracting them into the phone when they are not in use.

Sliders supplanted the flip form, since they allowed manufacturers to pack more keypad buttons and features (especially the side slider or QWERTY slider) into the same form factor, while touchscreen interfaces were still in their infancy. By the late-2000s, "slider" designs reached the peak of their popularity and declined afterward, being completely replaced by slate form factors with well-developed touch interfaces. Sliders briefly reappeared with designs like Xiaomi Mi MIX 3.

Sliders have also been used in non-phone devices, for example on the Mylo.

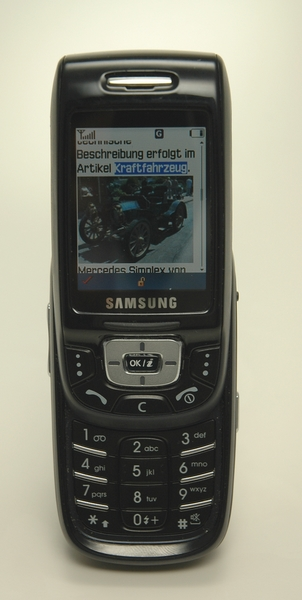
Samsung SGH-D500, standard slider

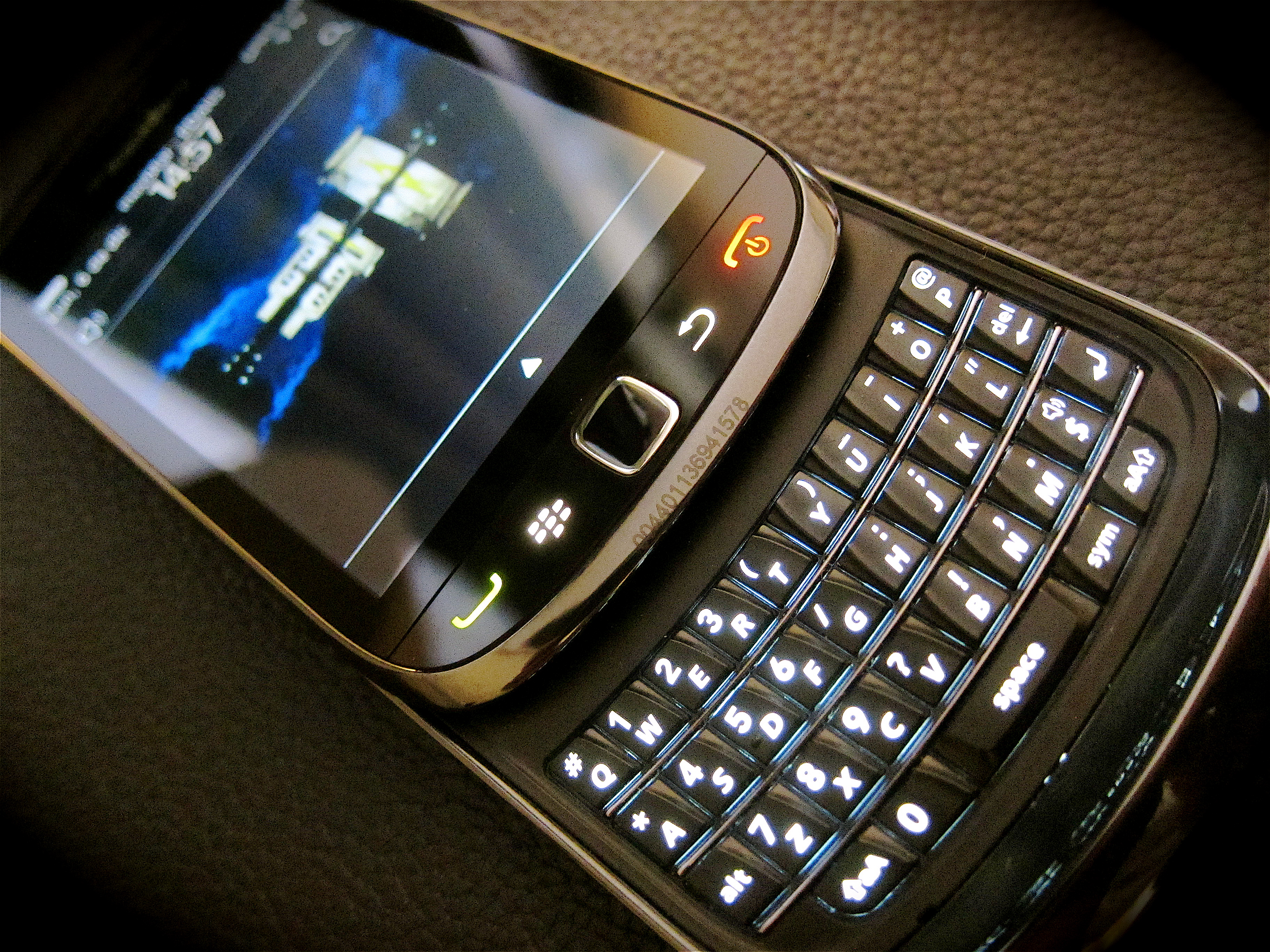
BlackBerry Torch 9800, a tall slider

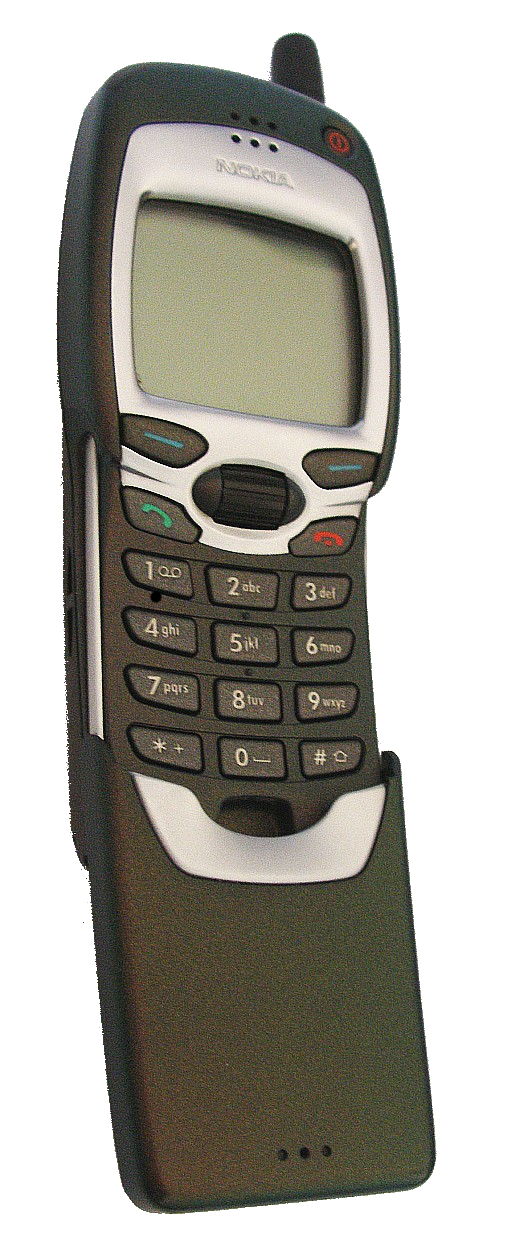
Nokia 7110, with a keypad cover slider

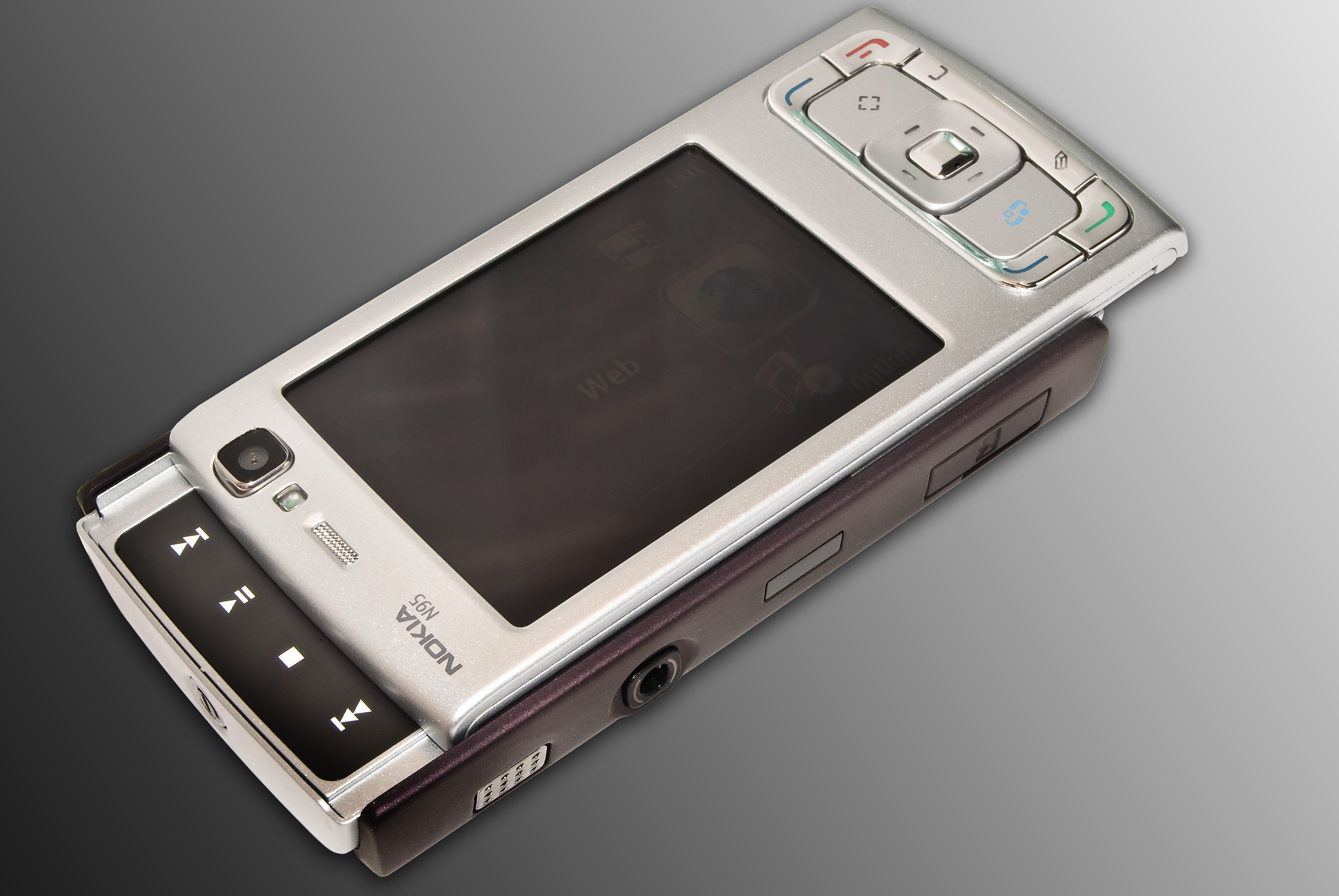
Nokia N95, a dual slider

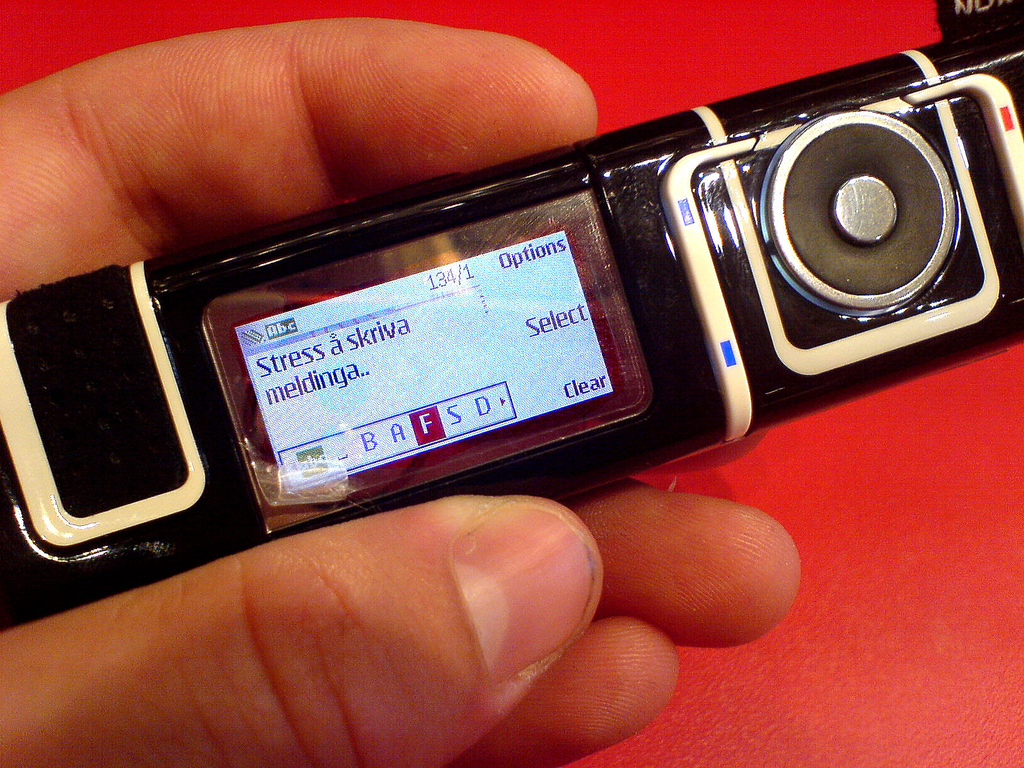
Nokia 7280, slider that hides the camera

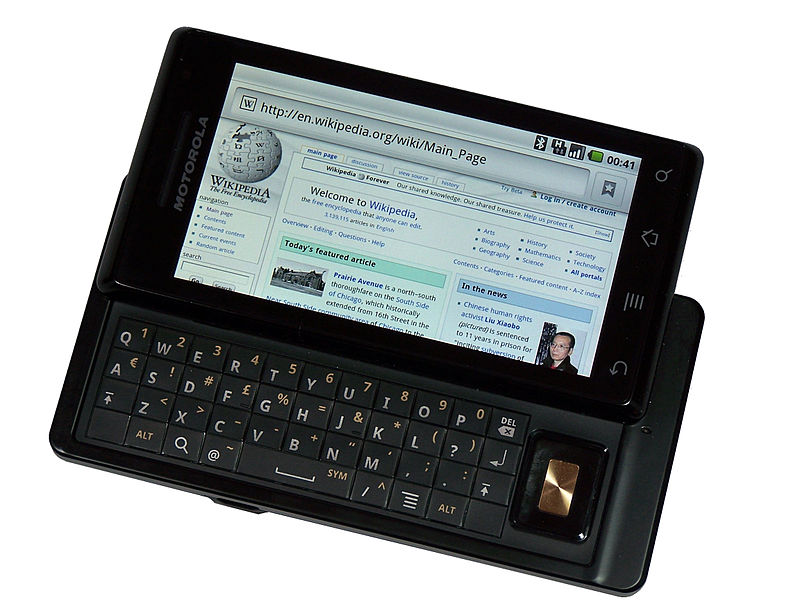
Motorola Droid, a wide QWERTY slider

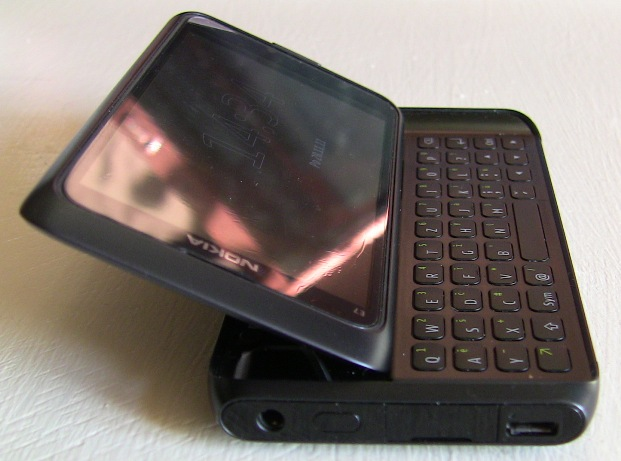
Nokia E7, QWERTY slider that angles up

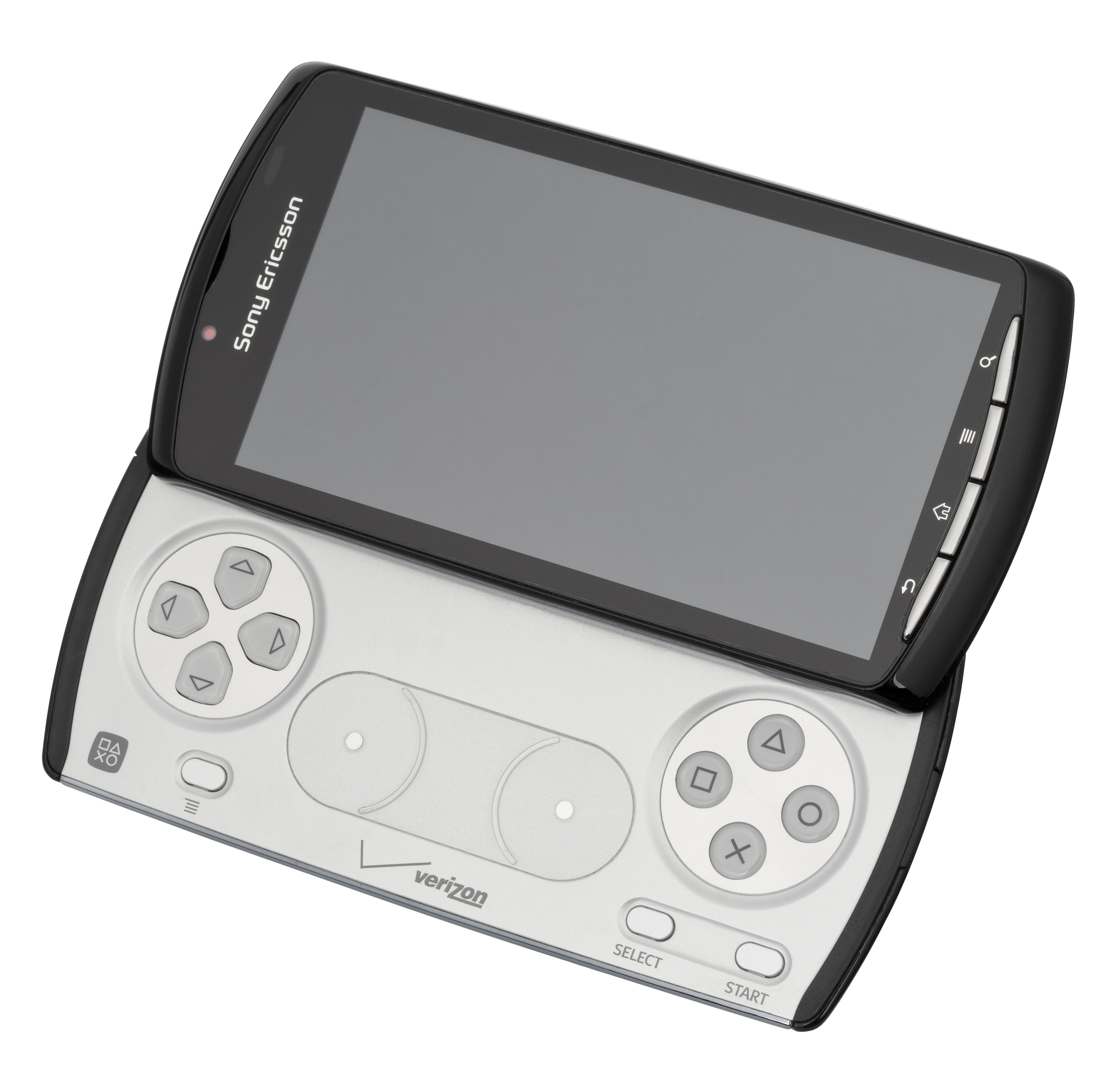
Xperia Play, a handheld game console slider

==== Pop up camera ====
Phones like the OnePlus 7 Pro, Oppo Find X and Vivo Nex hide front cameras within the body of the devices in motorized pop-up modules to create a bezelless front face fully occupied by screens without any cutout while keeping a front-facing camera that can move up when required. Vivo V15 Pro and Centric S1 also come with a pop-up front-facing camera mechanism. One major drawback with pop-up cameras is their inherent complexity due to the mechanism used, as the components such as the motor take up space within the phone's internals which may also fail over time.

=== Swivel ===
A swivel phone is composed of multiple—usually two—segments, which swivel past each other about a sagittal axis (most of the time). Use of the swiveling form factor has similar goals to that of the slider, but this form factor is less widely used. Samples are, LG U900 + 960 + V9000, Motorola Flipout + V70 + V80, Nokia 7370, Siemens SK65, Samsung SCH-U470 + Samsung SGH-X830, and Sony Ericsson S700i + W600. The LG Wing implemented this feature into a slate design smartphone, with two touchscreens.

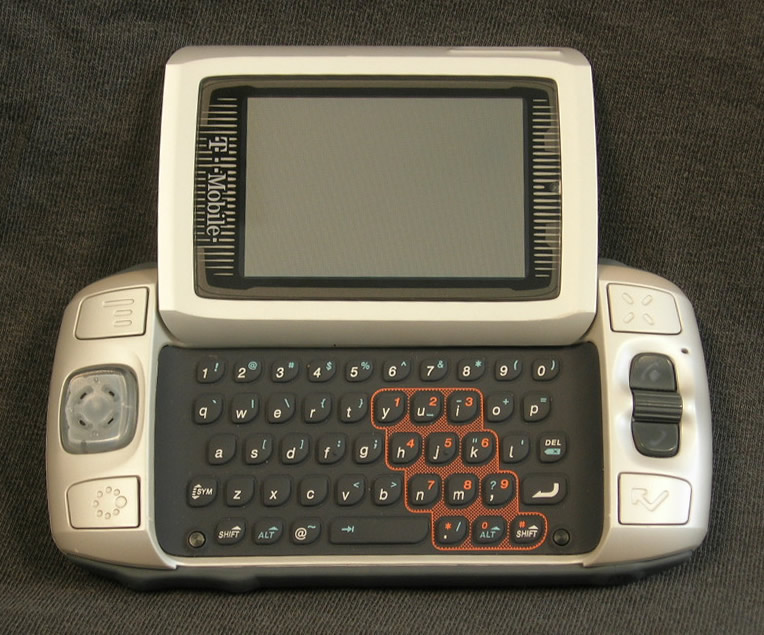
T-Mobile Sidekick II, looks more like a slider but has a swiveling display

Other examples include the Sierra Wireless Voq which combines a candybar with a keyboard "side-flip"; the Nokia Communicator series which utilise both a candybar and a clamshell with a QWERTY keyboard; the Siemens SK65 which is a swivel candybar with a QWERTY keyboard; and the T-Mobile Sidekick where the display swivels up with a QWERTY keyboard.

==== No sagittal axis ====
Some implementations, that do not use the sagittal axis, are presenting in phones like Nokia 3250 and Oppo N1, with twistable components: a keyboard, and main camera (doubling as a selfie one), respectively.

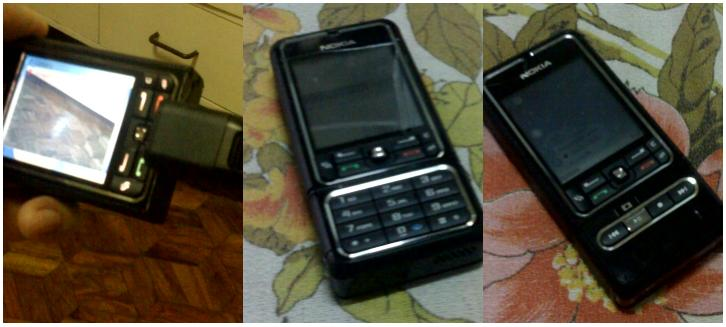
Nokia 3250, with twistable keypad

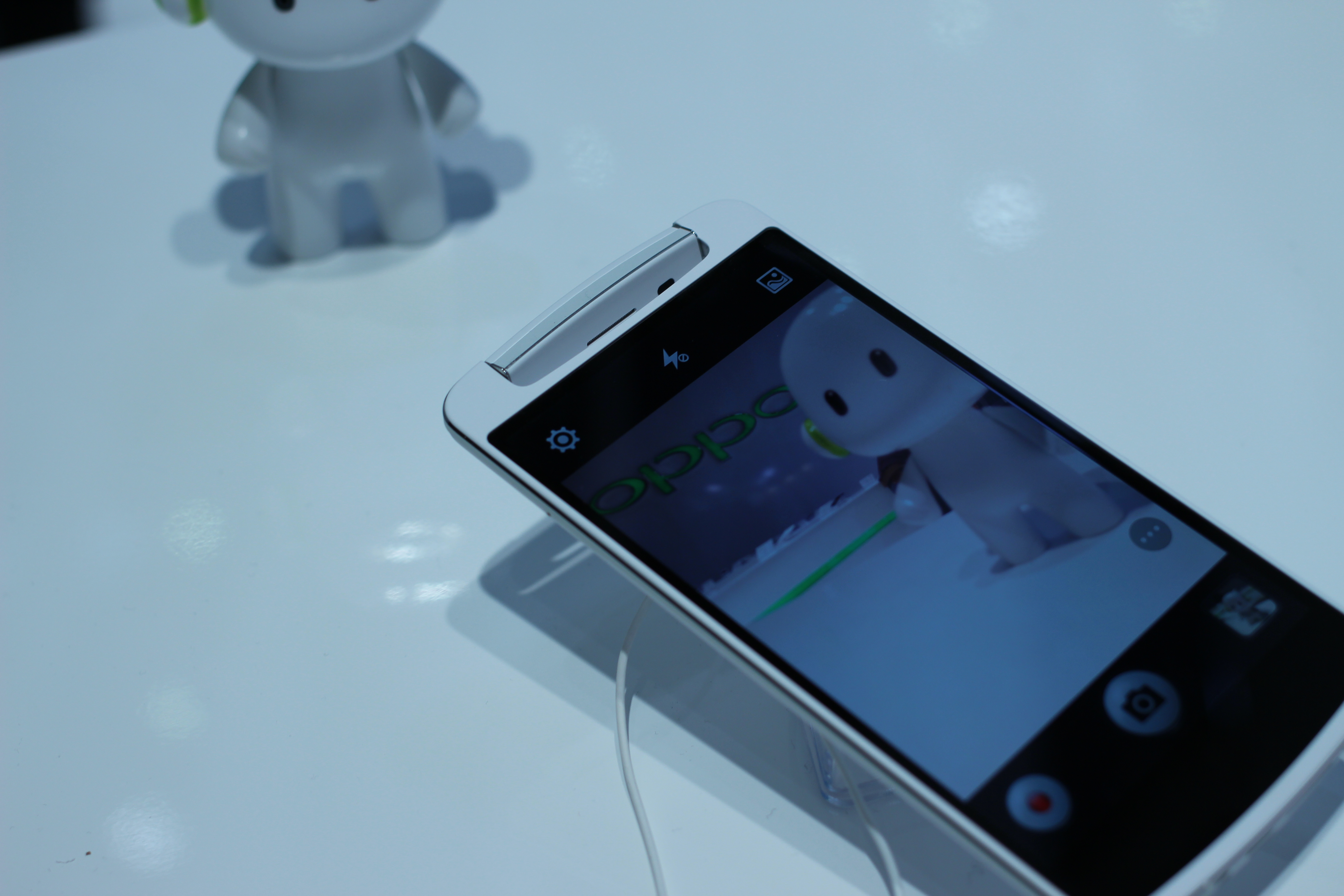
Oppo N1 has a twistable main camera that is used for selfies when rotates.

Some mobile phones use more than one form, such as the Nokia N90, Nokia 6260, Sharp SX862, Samsung SGH-P910, Samsung FlipShot SCH-U900, Samsung Alias series or Panasonic FOMA P900iV, which use both a swivel and a flip axis.

=== Mixed ===
Some phones use a combination of form factors, so, Nokia N93, P906i, W61SH use a combination of swivel and flip. Bezelless Samsung Galaxy A80 only has rear cameras that are housed in a motorized module, using a combination of slider and swivel they achieve the rotation to the front to be used for selfies.

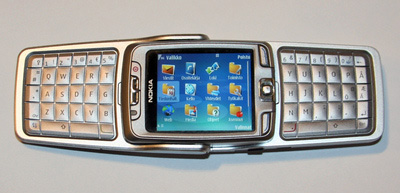
Nokia E70, unusual candybar/flip form with a QWERTY keyboard

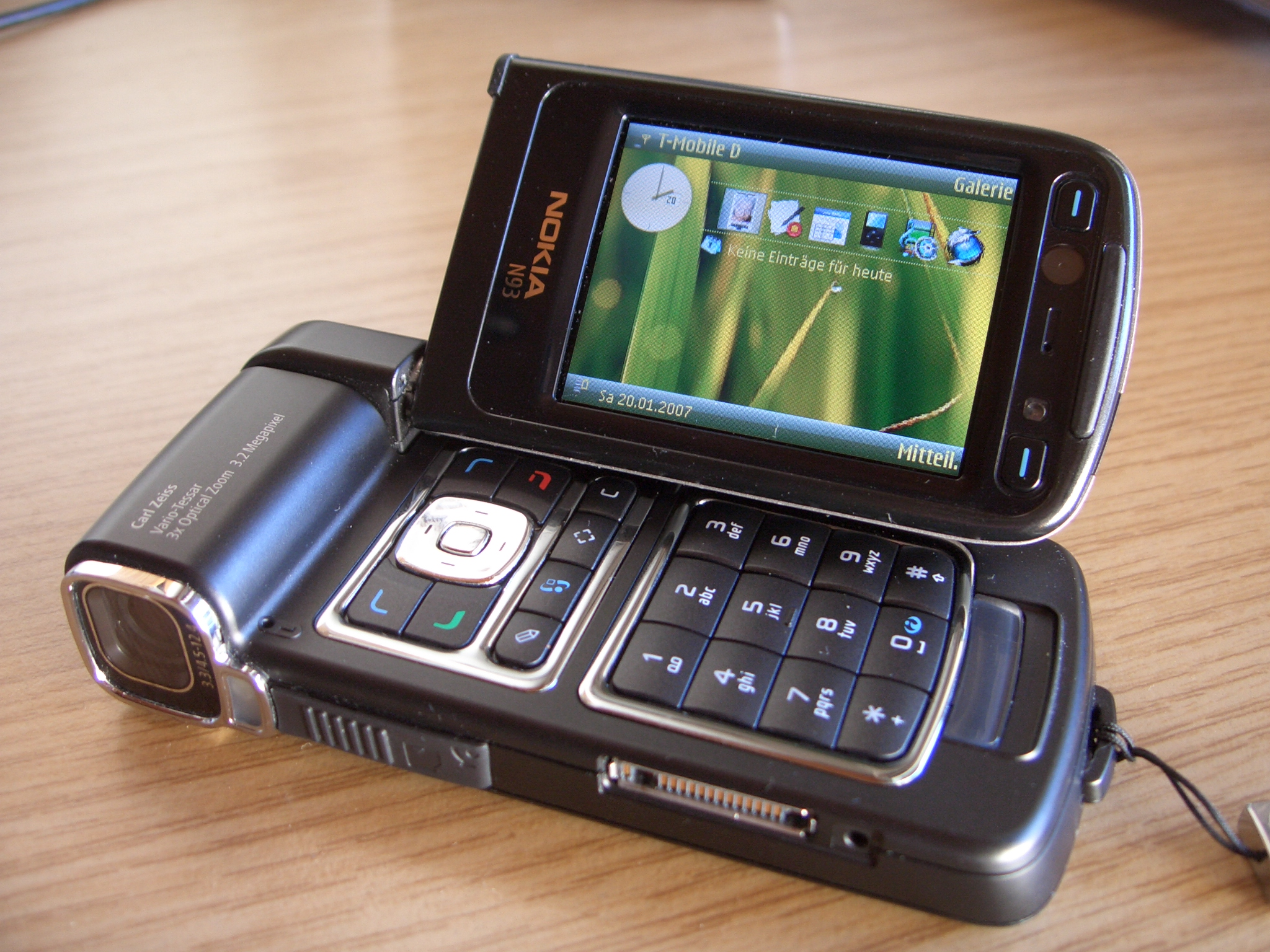
Nokia N93, mixed swivel/flip

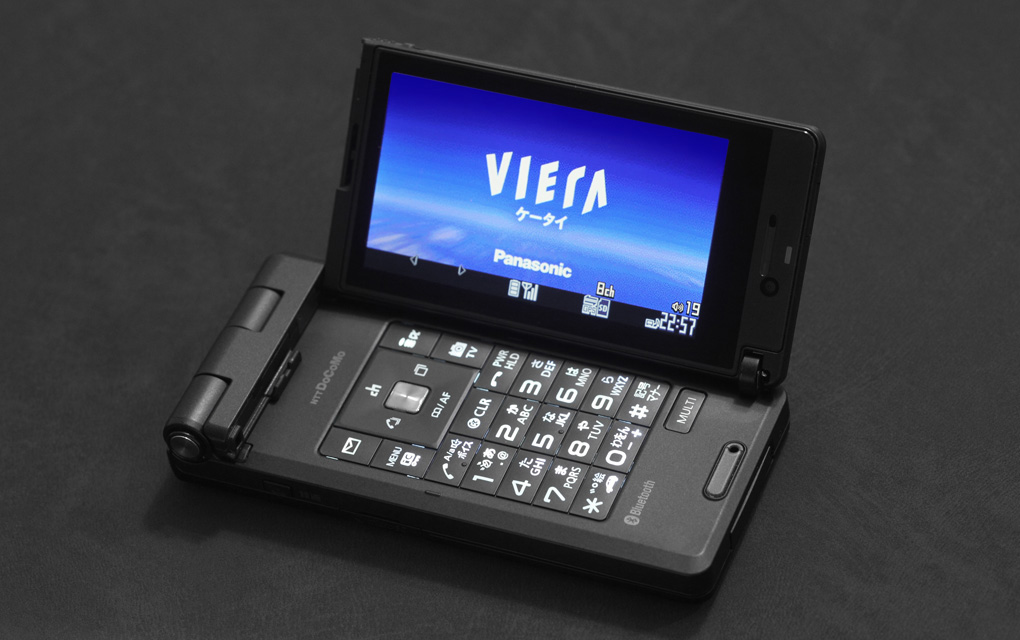
Docomo Panasonic P906i, W-Open

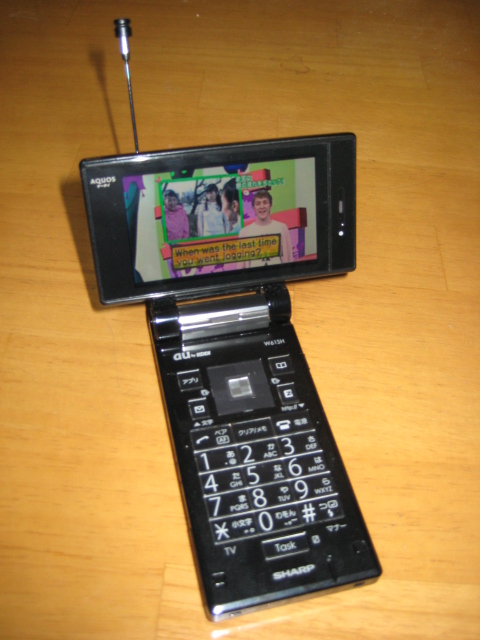
KDDI Sharp W61SH (Japan), mixed swivel/flip

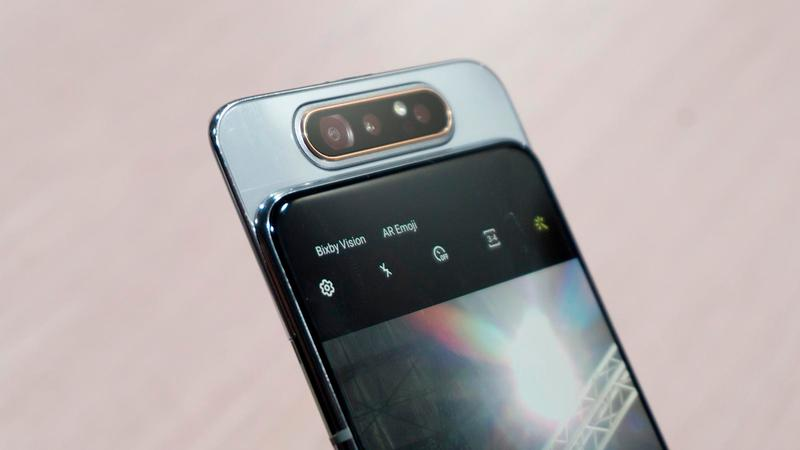
The rear camera module of Samsung Galaxy A80 rotated for selfie mode, using a combination of swivel/slider

== See also ==
- Car phone - a mobile (logically speaking) phone fixed to an automobile
- Mobile Phone Museum – Non-profit collection established in 2021
