= Asus ZenFone 6 =

2019 Asus flagship smartphone with flip camera

ZenFone 6

- ZenFone 6 in Midnight Black
- Brand: Asus ZenFone
- Manufacturer: AsusTek Computer Inc.
- Type: Phablet
- Series: Asus ZenFone
- First released: Valencia, Spain; 16 May 2019; 7 years ago
- Availability by region: List of regions: Spain; 17 May 2019; Europe; 23 May 2019; Germany; 25 May 2019; Taiwan; 7 June 2019; Hong Kong; 12 June 2019; India; 19 June 2019; United States; 25 September 2019; Brazil; 21 October 2019; Indonesia; 15 November 2019
- Predecessor: ZenFone 5Q, ZenFone 5, ZenFone 5Z
- Successor: ZenFone 7, ZenFone 7 Pro
- Compatible networks: 2G, 3G, 4G, 4G LTE
- Form factor: Slate
- Dimensions: H: 159.1 mm (6.26 in), W: 75.44 mm (2.970 in), D: 8.4 mm (0.33 in) to 9.1 mm (0.36 in)
- Weight: 190 g (6.7 oz)
- Operating system: Original: Android 9 Pie with ZenUI 6; Current: Android 11^{[as of April 2021]}
- System-on-chip: Qualcomm Snapdragon 855
- CPU: Kryo 485 (1×2.84 GHz, 3×2.42 GHz, 4×1.78 GHz)
- GPU: Adreno 640 (672 MHz)
- Modem: Dual SIM, Snapdragon X24 LTE
- Memory: 6 GB/8 GB LPDDR4X RAM, 12 GB (Edition 30)
- Storage: UFS 2.1 64/128/256 GB, 512 GB (Edition 30)
- Removable storage: MicroSDXC up to 2 TB
- Battery: 3.8 V 19 Wh (5,000 mAh) non-removable lithium polymer battery
- Charging: USB-C Quick Charge 4.0 up to 18 W; USB-C OTG reverse charging up to 10 W
- Rear camera: Main: Sony Exmor IMX586 48 MP 1/2.0" (0.8 μm) Quad Bayer sensor, ƒ/1.79 aperture, 79° FOV, 26 mm equivalent, 6p lens, 2×1 OCL PDAF, Laser AF; Ultra-wide: Sony 13 MP, ƒ/2.4 aperture, 125° FOV, 11 mm equivalent, fixed-focus, distortion correction; Modes: Dual-LED flash, Auto HDR, (Auto) Panorama, Portrait, Super Night, long exposure, AI scene detection, filters, Pro/RAW (main only); Video: up to 4K UHD at 60 fps, 3-axis EIS, slow-motion video (1080p at 240 fps/720p at 480 fps), Motion Tracking, timelapse
- Front camera: Motorised flip-up rear camera
- Display: 6.4 in (160 mm) rounded LED-backlit IPS LCD, 19.5:9 1080×2340 px, 403 ppi (159 px/cm), 600 nits, HDR10 1200:1 CR, 60 Hz, 100% DCI-P3/96% NTSC
- Sound: 192 kHz/24-bit Hi-Res audio, DTS:X Ultra 1.0 7.1-channel virtual surround, dual NXP TFA9874 amplifiers, Stereo speakers, 3.5 mm jack, USB Audio Device digital audio via USB-C, aptX HD/SBC Bluetooth A2DP, ERM vibration motor
- Connectivity: USB 2.0 Type-C, Wi-Fi 5 802.11 a/b/g/n/ac 2x2 MIMO, Wi-Fi Direct/hotspot, Bluetooth 5.0 EDR, NFC
- Data inputs: Multi-touch capacitive touchscreen, Accelerometer, gyroscope (supports ARCore), magnetometer, ambient light sensor, dual microphones, Hall sensor, laser autofocus, rear fingerprint scanner, GPS/GLONASS/BDS/GALILEO/QZSS navigation, FM radio
- Model: ZS630KL; Global: I01WD Ver. A; Asia-Pacific: I01WD Ver. B; North America: I01WDX Ver. C
- Codename: Asus S630
- SAR: Head: 1.43 W/kg, Body: 1.56 W/kg, Hotspot: 1.35 W/kg
- Hearing aid compatibility: M4, T4
- Made in: Taiwan
- Other: Gorilla Glass 6 display, Gorilla Glass 3 back, liquid metal camera housing, aluminium frame
- Website: www.asus.com/Phone/ZenFone-6-ZS630KL

The ZenFone 6 is a 2019 Android-based smartphone that was manufactured, released, and marketed by Asus. It is the only release in Asus' sixth-generation ZenFone lineup and directly succeeds the ZenFone 5Z. Asus chairman Jonney Shih unveiled the ZenFone 6 on 16 May 2019 in Valencia, Spain, and it was released in Spain the following day.

The ZenFone 6 has a larger 6.4-inch (160 mm) display, a faster processor, and upgraded cameras than the ZenFone 5Z. The ZenFone 6's flip-up camera module doubles as a front-facing camera. It is the first mobile device Asus released after restructuring its smartphone division in late 2018. The ZenFone 6 was released in the Indian market as the "Asus 6Z".

Despite positive reviews, the ZenFone 6 lacked broad appeal and attracted a niche market of power users and technology enthusiasts. Supply issues resulted in delays and stock shortages, which also interfered with its success. As of 2020, Asus has not released sales figures for the device, only noting the ZenFone has "created excellent sales".

== History ==
=== Background ===
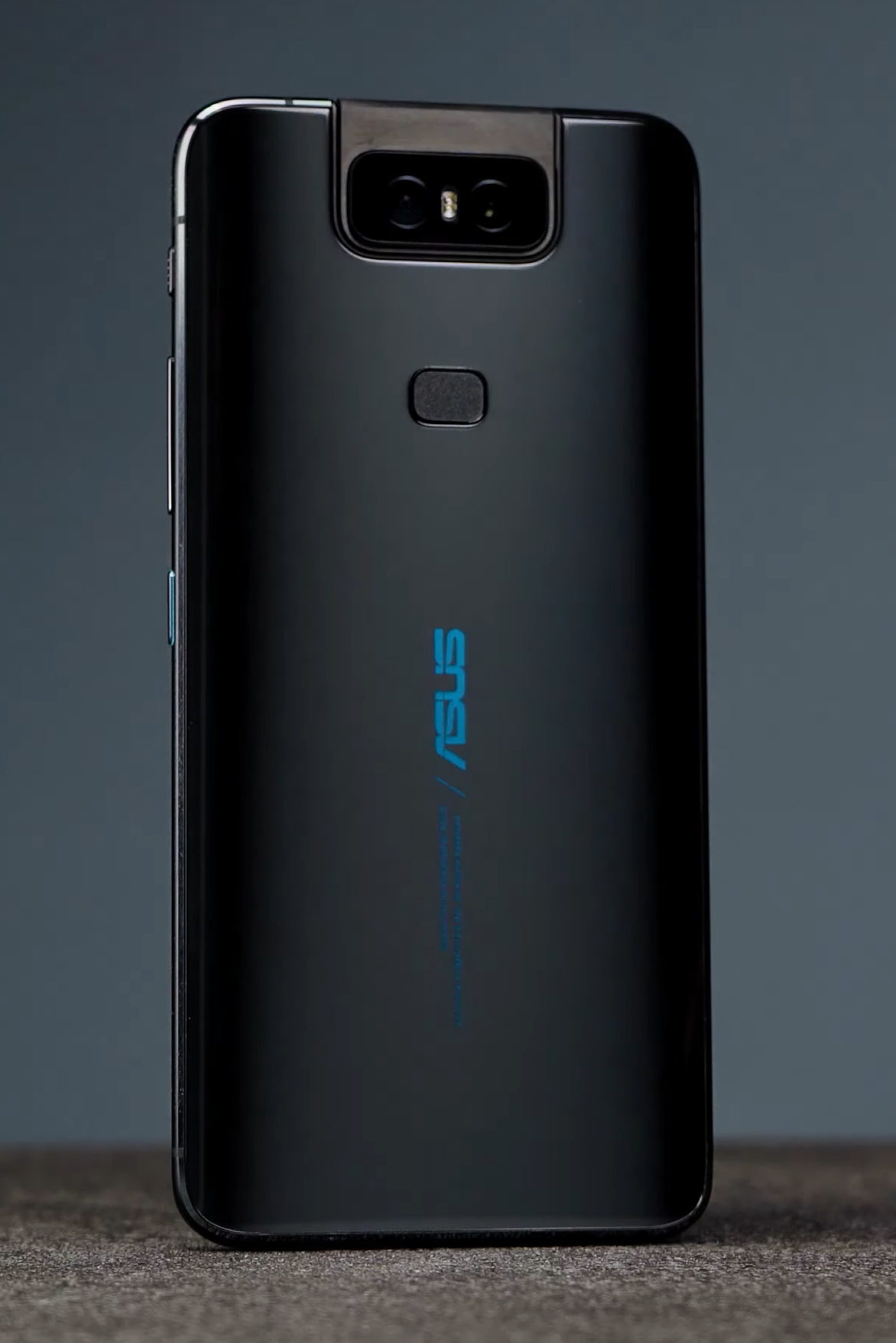
The ZenFone 6 in Midnight Black

Before the ZenFone 6 was partially unveiled at the Mobile World Congress (MWC Barcelona), information about prototype devices was leaked but none of the depicted devices were marketed to the public. In October 2018, an alleged leak of a prototype smartphone with a semi-circular, off-centre cutout for the front-facing camera was circulated. In February 2019, another leaked image showed a more conventional device with thick bezels and an iridescent back. Both leaked images showed a device with conventional, vertical, triple-camera array on the rear.

In late 2018, Asus's smartphone division underwent a significant corporate restructuring process, which involved allocating NT$6 billion (US$195 million, €171M, or £152M as of 2018) towards a new focus on "power users and gamers." The move was prompted by the success of the gamer-focused ROG Phone and aimed to shift the division's direction towards catering to this demographic. The shift in direction was formalised in a resolution by Asus' board of directors on 13 December 2018. Asus announced then-CEO Jerry Shen's departure from Asus, effective 1 January 2019.

At the February 2019 MWC Barcelona, Asus announced that the phone would be unveiled and launched on 16 May and provided a promotional silhouette image of the phone's bezel with no cameras visible, hinting at its design. Initially, there were misunderstandings over the launch date after a two-page advertisement in the magazine Mobile World Daily with an incorrect launch date of 14 May 2019 was given to journalists.

In early May 2019, another supposedly leaked image of the ZenFone 6 appeared; it showed a device with a form factor similar to the released product, with a similarly mounted rear dual-camera module and a mechanical slider, a retractable front camera mechanism similar to the one used in the Xiaomi Mi MIX 3 in place of the flip mechanism in the final design. On 14 May 2019, two days prior to the official unveiling of the ZenFone 6, accurate renderings and specifications of the device were leaked by Taiwanese outlet Sogi.

=== Release ===
Following its unveiling on 16 May 2019, Asus gradually released the ZenFone 6 to European markets at a starting price of €499. On 28 May, India's Delhi High Court issued an interim order restraining Asus from selling smartphones, tablets, and accessories branded "Zen" and "ZenFone" in violation of Telecare Network India's Zen Mobile trademark. This led Asus to rebrand the phone as the "Asus 6Z" for the Indian market.

For the initial international release, the novel use of liquid metal for the camera module's casing caused inventory shortages and delays in many markets. Some model configurations were sold out on the day of release in the United States. From 22 July that year, Asus rolled out an over-the-air update to software update version .167, which caused some users' devices to crash, reboot, or get stuck in a "bootloop" where the device is stuck in a loop of turning itself on and off. An Asus representative attributed this behaviour to a hardware issue, saying the update triggers a motherboard malfunction, the only solution to which was a motherboard replacement under existing warranty.

The release of the ZenFone 6 was followed by Asus' ROG Phone II, which was announced in July 2019 and released in September 2019. The ZenFone supports Google's Android 9 Pie and Android 10, both with ZenUI 6, Asus's customised Android front end. In November 2019, Asus released an Android 10 update for the ZenFone 6, two months after Google's release of the update to Android.

In late August 2019, Asus started recruiting ZenFone 6 users for an Android 11 beta program, which was subsequently released to the public in December 2020. The flip-camera design that was introduced in the ZenFone 6 was also employed in its successors, the 2020 ZenFone 7 series and the 2021 ZenFone 8 Flip.

=== Edition 30 ===
Left: Zenfone 6 Edition 30 logo
Right: Asus' 30th-anniversary stylised A

On 27 May 2019, during a special press event at Computex, Asus chairman Jonney Shih unveiled the Asus ZenFone Edition 30 to commemorate Asus' 30th anniversary. The phone features an exclusive back design, and upgraded storage and RAM to 512 GB and 12 GB respectively. The Edition 30 comes in matte black with a radial finish and has a stylised, 30th anniversary "A" with a matte black Asus logo. The device's hardware and software features are identical to those of the regular models. It is the only model to come with a 30-month warranty and production was limited to 3,000 units.

== Features ==
Video demonstrating the flip camera's retracting action

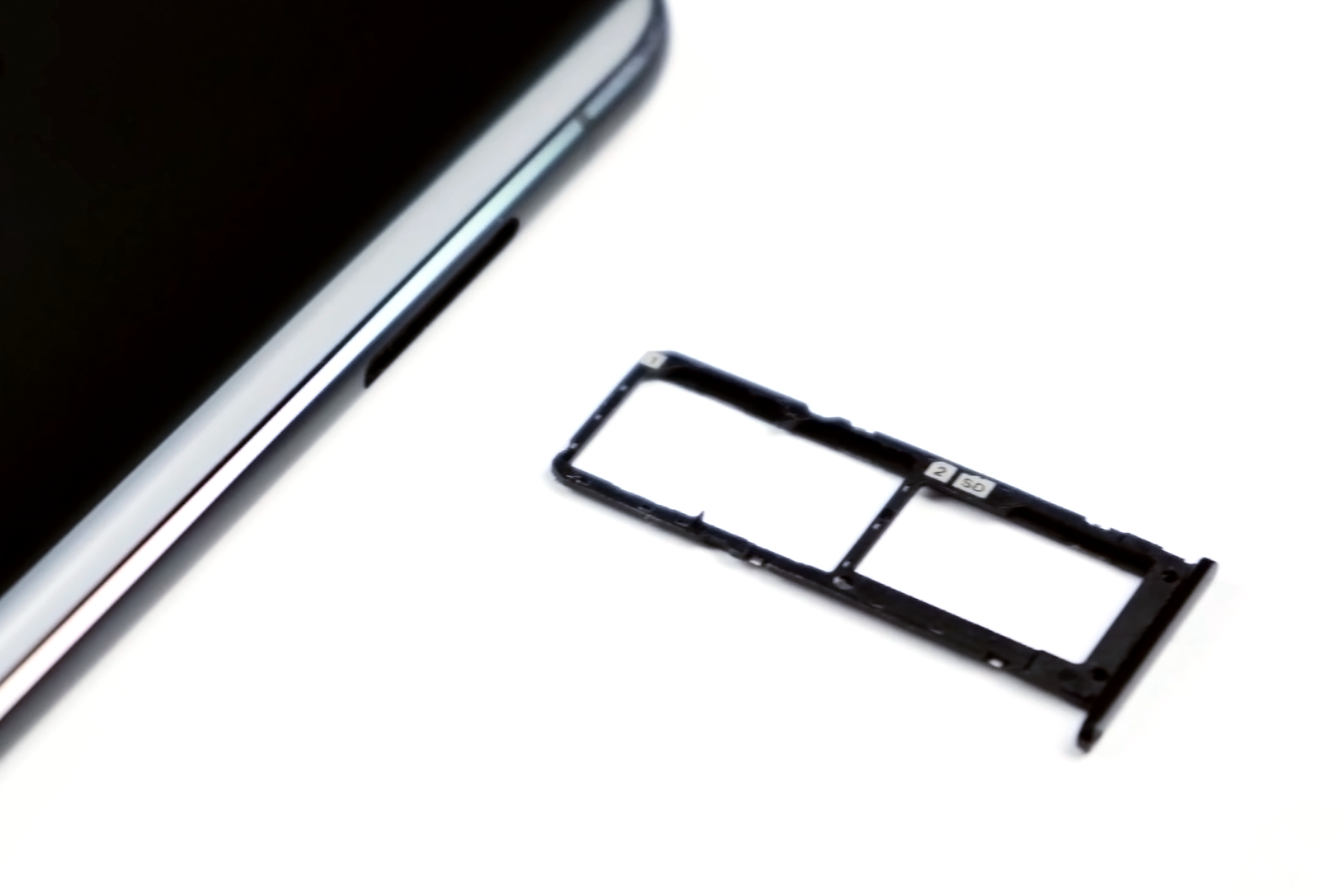
The SIM tray of a ZenFone 6, with distinct slots for two SIM cards and a microSD card

=== Design ===
The ZenFone 6 is available in glossy Midnight Black and glossy Twilight Silver, silver-blue shade. Its unique flip-camera module is similar to that of the Samsung Galaxy A80, which has a combined sliding-rotating main camera. The camera's flip mechanism is driven by a miniature stepper motor and a magnetically linked reduction gearbox, resulting in two-degree microsteps. The gearbox prevents direct, external actuation of the stepper motor, reducing the risk of damage to the stepper motor and the internal mechanisms. The camera module's casing is constructed of an amorphous, metallic alloy that is similar to Liquidmetal in its durability, weight, high yield strength, and anti-wearing properties needed in a mechanical component that is subject to repeated stress.

The 6.4-inch (16 cm) IPS LCD is marketed as a "NanoEdge display" for the reduced bezel size. The display's Corning Gorilla Glass 6 is curved using Nano Molding Technology. The back panel is formed from Gorilla Glass 3 and has a capacitive fingerprint sensor.

On one edge, the ZenFone 6 has a function-customisable "Smart Key" with tactile indents, a volume rocker, and a power button that are outlined in blue on the black models. The ZenFone 6 has received the Japan Institute of Design Promotion's Good Design Award in 2019 and a iF Product Design Award in 2020.

=== Hardware ===
The ZenFone 6 has a Qualcomm Snapdragon 855 system on a chip running at stock clock speed and memory capacities of 6 GB of LPDDR4X RAM and 64 GB of UFS 2.1 storage, and up to 12 GB and 512 GB respectively for the 30th Anniversary Edition.

The device uses a double-layer, stacked motherboard design that was used in Apple's 2017 iPhone X and successive iPhone models. The motherboard's printed circuit board has Anylayer interconnect technology, resulting in a smaller size, which Asus says enabled them to fit a large 5,000 mAh battery into the chassis.

=== Software ===
The ZenFone 6 debuted alongside ZenUI 6, a new version of Asus' customisation of the Android operating system that was initially based on Android 9. The ZenFone 6 has software features that are specific to the flip camera, including an object-tracking video mode, an auto-panorama mode, and manual camera-angle controls. Changes to ZenUI 6 include a greater focus on single-handed operation, an overhauled notifications menu, dark mode with a light-on-dark color scheme, and a reduced number of preinstalled applications. Android 10 was released for the device in November 2019, and Android 11 was released in December 2020. The last software and security update for the ZenFone 6 was released in August 2021.

== Reception ==
The ZenFone 6 received positive reviews from media outlets and was praised for its value proposition, long battery life, clean implementation of Android, edge-to-edge display, and general build quality for its price. Asus said the device "has been well evaluated and created excellent sales". The ZenFone 6 was praised by reviewers as one of the few 2019 flagship devices that retained the headphone jack.

Concerns over the long-term durability of the device's flip camera, especially its novel design, were raised. Asus rates the mechanism to withstand up to 100,000 actuations. Reviewers praised the versatility of the flip-camera concept but some considered it to be a gimmick. The flip camera enabled the ZenFone 6 to be one of the best selfie cameras of 2019 with a DxOMark selfie score of 98, the highest-yet at the time of review. The phone received a DxOMark camera score—a quantitative measure of camera quality—of 104, the highest for an Asus device.

Business Insider dubbed the device "the best new smartphone of 2019 so far", Android Authority called it "[a]n absolute steal", while The Verge praised its "incredible battery life". In terms of software, reviewers noted ZenUI 6 provides an experience closer to that of stock Android—the version of the Android mobile operating system developed and designed by Google. Reviewers also praised the relatively frequent software updates, however, were also disappointed by the lack of support for Android 12 with software and security updates ceasing in 2021. In February 2020, eight months after the phone's release, online publication Digital Trends affirmed their recommendation of the ZenFone 6 as "one of [their] top smartphone recommendations" for the price of US$500, taking into account devices that had been released in the interim.

Critics noted the phone lacks several features that are present on other high-end devices; these include an OLED display, optical image stabilisation, high-speed charging, wireless charging, and water resistance. Reports also noted the lack of advertising and mainstream appeal in western markets. As of August 2020, the ZenFone 6 had sold over 100,000 units in Taiwan, its native market.

Preceded by ZenFone 5Q; ZenFone 5 ZenFone 5Z	ZenFone 6; 6th generation	Succeeded by ZenFone 7 ZenFone 7 Pro
