= Asus ZenFone 9 =

ASUS smartphone

- Brand: Asus ZenFone
- Manufacturer: Asus
- Type: Smartphone
- Series: Asus ZenFone
- First released: September 15, 2022; 3 years ago
- Predecessor: Asus ZenFone 8
- Successor: Asus ZenFone 10
- Compatible networks: 2G / 3G / 4G LTE / 5G NR
- Form factor: Slate
- Dimensions: 146.5 mm (5.77 in) H 68.1 mm (2.68 in) W 9.1 mm (0.36 in) D
- Weight: 169 g (6.0 oz)
- Operating system: Android 12 upgradable to Android 13 and/or Android 14
- System-on-chip: Qualcomm Snapdragon 8+ Gen 1 (4 nm)
- CPU: Octa-core (1x3.19 GHz Cortex-X2 & 3x2.75 GHz Cortex-A710 & 4x1.80 GHz Cortex-A510)
- GPU: Adreno 730
- Memory: 8 or 16 GB RAM
- Storage: 128 or 256 GB
- SIM: Dual SIM (Nano-SIM, dual stand-by)
- Battery: 4300 mAh
- Charging: Fast charging 30W
- Rear camera: 50 MP, f/1.9, 26mm (wide), 1/1.56", 1.0μm, PDAF, gimbal OIS; 12 MP, f/2.2, 113° (ultrawide), 1/2.93", 1.4μm, AF; LED flash, HDR, panorama; 8K@24fps, 4K@30/60/120fps, 1080p@30/60/240fps, 720p@480fps; gyro-EIS, HDR
- Front camera: 12 MP, f/2.5, 28mm (standard), 1/2.93", 1.22μm, dual pixel PDAF; 4K@30fps, 1080p@30/60fps
- Display: 5.9 in (150 mm); 2400 x 1080 px resolution, 20:9 ratio (~445 ppi density); Super AMOLED, 120Hz, HDR10+, 1100 nits (peak); Corning Gorilla Glass Victus; Logical Dimensions: 873 x 393
- External display: Always on
- Sound: Stereo speakers
- Connectivity: Wi-Fi 802.11 a/b/g/n/ac/6e, dual-band, Wi-Fi Direct, DLNA, hotspot; Bluetooth 5.2, A2DP, LE, aptX HD, aptX Adaptive, LDAC
- Data inputs: Multi-touch screen; USB Type-C 3.0; Fingerprint scanner (side-mounted); Accelerometer; Gyroscope; Proximity sensor; Compass
- Water resistance: IP68 dust/water resistant (up to 1.5m for 30 mins)
- Website: www.asus.com/Mobile/Phones/ZenFone/Zenfone-9/

The Asus ZenFone 9 is an Android smartphone designed, developed, and manufactured by Asus as part of its Asus ZenFone line of smartphones. It was announced on July 28, 2022.

Preceded by ZenFone 8	ZenFone 9; 9th generation	Succeeded by ---
