= Asus ZenFone =

Discontinued series of smartphone models

- Asus ZenFone 6
- Developer: Asus
- Type: Smartphones
- Released: May 2014
- Discontinued: January 2026
- Operating system: Android
- Online services: Google Play
- Website: www.asus.com/Phone/ZenFone-Products/

Asus ZenFone is a discontinued series of Android smartphones designed, marketed and produced by Asus from 2014 until 2026. Various models are powered by a series of Intel Atom, Qualcomm Snapdragon, and MediaTek processors. Most ZenFone also features the ZenUI user interface.

== History ==
The first-generation ZenFones were announced at the 2014 Consumer Electronic Show in Las Vegas, Nevada; it uses the same "Zen" moniker originally introduced with the ZenBook laptops.

In January 2026, ASUS' chairman Jonney Shih officially declared it would stop producing new smartphone models, but older smartphones would still have warranty and software support. The R&D of the smartphone market has been moved to commercial PCs and physical AI.

== ZenUI interface ==
ASUS ZenUI is a front-end touch interface developed by Asus with partners, featuring a full touch user interface. ZenUI also comes with Asus-made apps preloaded like ZenLink (PC Link, Share Link, Party Link & Remote Link).

The ZenUI made its debut in the Asus ZenFone series, Asus Memo Pad 7 (ME176C) and Asus Padfone Mini (2014). Apart from ZenFone, the interface was also used on Asus Pegasus 3, Asus PadFone devices, Asus Memo Pad 7 & 8, Asus Fonepad 7 & 8, Asus Zenpad 10, and Asus Transformer Pad.

=== WaveShare UI ===
Before ZenUI, Asus made a front-end interface for Android phones and tablets called ASUS WaveShare UI, originally released on the Asus PadFone hybrid smartphone/tablet, and was later used on other Asus products. The last gadget to use the WaveShare UI was the ASUS MeMO Pad HD 7. Devices that used this UI were:

- Asus PadFone Infinity (A80)
- Asus Fonepad Note 6 (ME560CG)
- Asus New PadFone Infinity
- Asus PadFone 2 (A68)
- Asus Eee Pad Transformer
- Asus Slider Pad
- Asus Eee Pad Slider
- Asus Fonepad 7(ME372cg)

== First generation (2014) ==
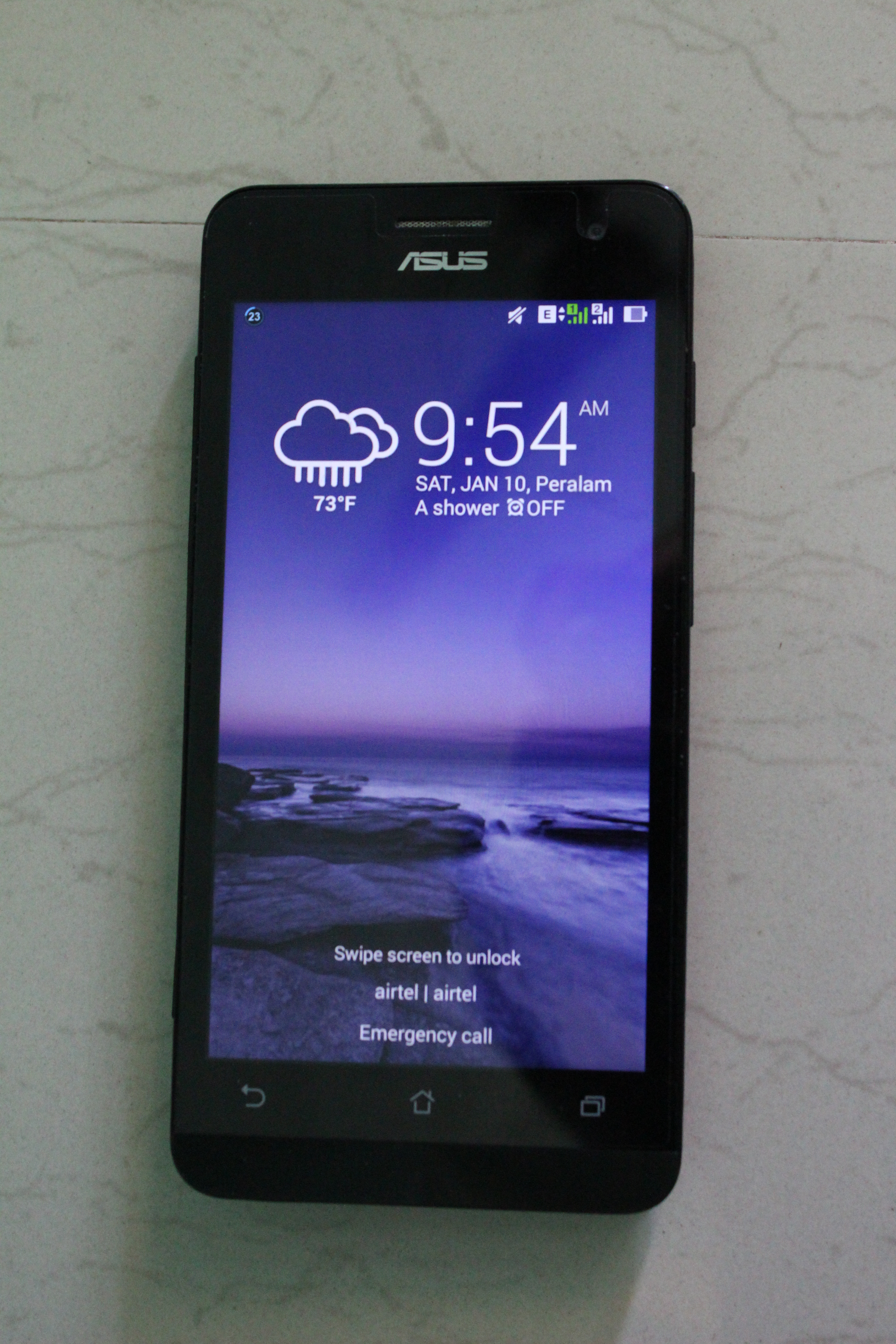
ZenFone 5

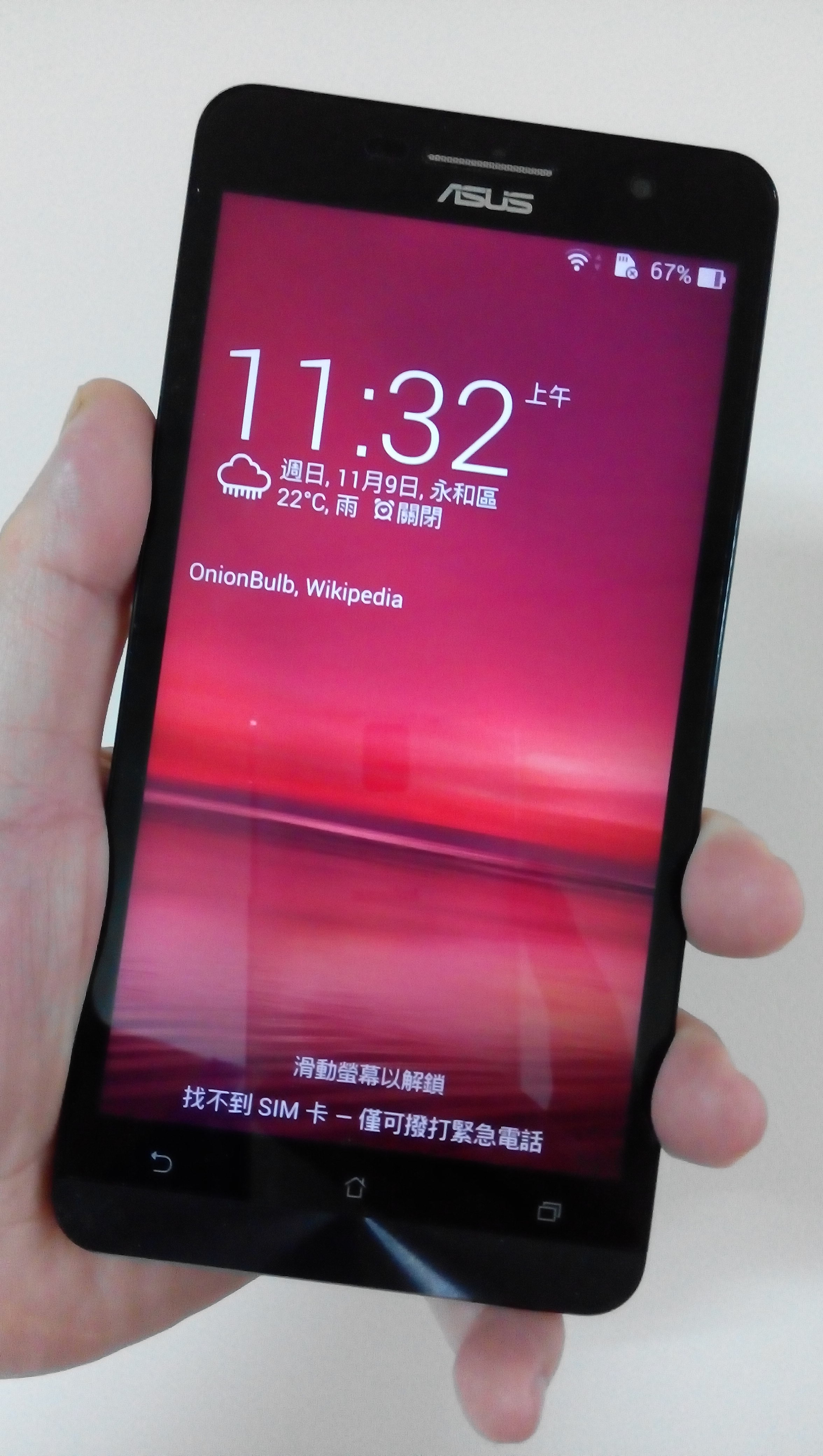
ZenFone 5

=== ZenFone 4 ===
The ZenFone 4 is the 4-inch WVGA (800×480) TFT display model. The ZenFone 4 features a 1.2 GHz dual-core Intel Atom Z2520 saltwell processor, a 5 MP rear & 0.3 MP front camera and 1 GB RAM. However, ZenFone 4 does not have an LED flash unlike the rest of the models in the ZenFone series.

=== ZenFone 4.5 ===
The ZenFone 4.5 is the 4.5-inch WVGA (854×480) TFT display model. Using the same processor as the ZenFone 4 and having 8GB of internal storage, 1GB of RAM and a MicroSD Card Slot supporting up to 64GB Storage, it does have a better rear camera than the ZenFone 4. The phone carries an 8 MP rear camera, and uses the same 0.3MP front camera as the ZenFone 4 does.

=== ZenFone 5 ===
The ZenFone 5 is the mid range of the series and includes a 5-inch 1280×720 HD IPS display protected with Corning Gorilla Glass 3. This Zenfone features either a dual-core hyper-threaded (dubbed Multicore) Intel Atom or a quad-core Qualcomm Snapdragon processor, an 8 MP rear and 2 MP front camera.

This phone comes with 2 GB of RAM in comparison to other models and features at a competitive price. However, some of the earlier productions and certain variants of this phone came with 1 GB of RAM.

=== ZenFone 6 ===
The ZenFone 6 features a 6-inch 1280×720 IPS display. The ZenFone 6 features a 2 GHz dual-core Intel Atom Z2580 processor, a 13 megapixel rear camera and 2 megapixel front-facing camera. The ZenFone 6 is equipped with 8 GB, 16 GB or 32 GB of internal memory, depending upon the version, external memory of up to 64 GB, and 2 GB of RAM.

=== Variants ===
| Model | Processor | Processor Architecture | RAM | GPU | Display | Camera | Internal Storage | Battery | Platform |
|---|---|---|---|---|---|---|---|---|---|
| ZenFone 4 (A400CG) | Intel Atom dual-core Z2520 (1.2 GHz) | x86 | 1 GB | PowerVR SGX544MP2 | 4.0 inches, WVGA 800x480, TFT Corning Gorilla Glass 3 | VGA front 5 MP rear | 4 GB/8 GB | 1200 mAh/1600 mAh | Android 4.3 Jelly Bean; upgradable to Android KitKat 4.4.2 |
| ZenFone 4 (A450CG) | Intel Atom dual-core Z2520 (1.2 GHz) | x86 | 1 GB | PowerVR SGX544MP2 | 4.5 inches, WVGA 854x480, IPS Corning Gorilla Glass 3 | VGA front 5 MP rear | 8 GB | 1750 mAh | Android 4.4 KitKat; upgradable to Android 5.0.2 Lollipop |
| ZenFone 5 (A500CG) | Intel Atom dual-core Z2580 (2.0 GHz) | x86 | 2 GB | PowerVR SGX544MP2 | 5.0 inches, HD 1280x720, IPS Corning Gorilla Glass 3 | 2 MP front 8 MP rear | 8 GB/16 GB/32 GB | 2110 mAh | Android 4.3 Jellybean; upgradable to Android 4.4.2 KitKat |
| ZenFone 5 (A501CG) | Intel Atom dual-core Z2560 (1.6 GHz) | x86 | 2 GB | PowerVR SGX544MP2 | 5.0 inches, HD 1280x720, IPS Corning Gorilla Glass 3 | 2 MP front 8 MP rear | 8 GB/16 GB | 2110 mAh | Android 4.3 Jelly Bean; upgradable to Android 5.0.2 Lollipop |
| ZenFone 5 Lite (A502CG) | Intel Atom dual-core Z2520 (1.2 GHz) | x86 | 1 GB | PowerVR SGX544MP2 | 5.0 inches, VGA 960x540, IPS | VGA front 8 MP rear | 8 GB | 2500 mAh | Android 4.4.2 KitKat |
| ZenFone 5 (A500KL) | Qualcomm Snapdragon quad-core MSM8926 (1.2 GHz) | ARM32 | 2 GB | Adreno 305 | 5.0 inches, HD 1280x720, IPS Corning Gorilla Glass 3 | 2 MP front 8 MP rear | 8 GB/16 GB/32 GB | 2110 mAh | Android 4.4.2 KitKat; upgradable to Android Lollipop 5.0.2 |
| ZenFone 6 (A600CG) | Intel Atom dual-core Z2580 (2.0 GHz) | x86 | 2 GB | PowerVR SGX544MP2 | 6.0 inches, HD 1280x720, IPS Corning Gorilla Glass 3 | 2 MP front 13 MP rear | 16 GB/32 GB | 3300 mAh | Android 4.4.2 KitKat; upgradable to Android Lollipop 5.0.2 |
| ZenFone 6 (A601CG) | Intel Atom dual-core Z2560 (1.6 GHz) | x86 | 2 GB | PowerVR SGX544MP2 | 6.0 inches, HD 1280x720, IPS Corning Gorilla Glass 3 | 2 MP front 13 MP rear | 16 GB/32 GB | 3230 mAh | Android 4.4.2 KitKat; upgradable to Android Lollipop 5.0.2 |

== Second generation (2015) ==
=== ZenFone 2 ===
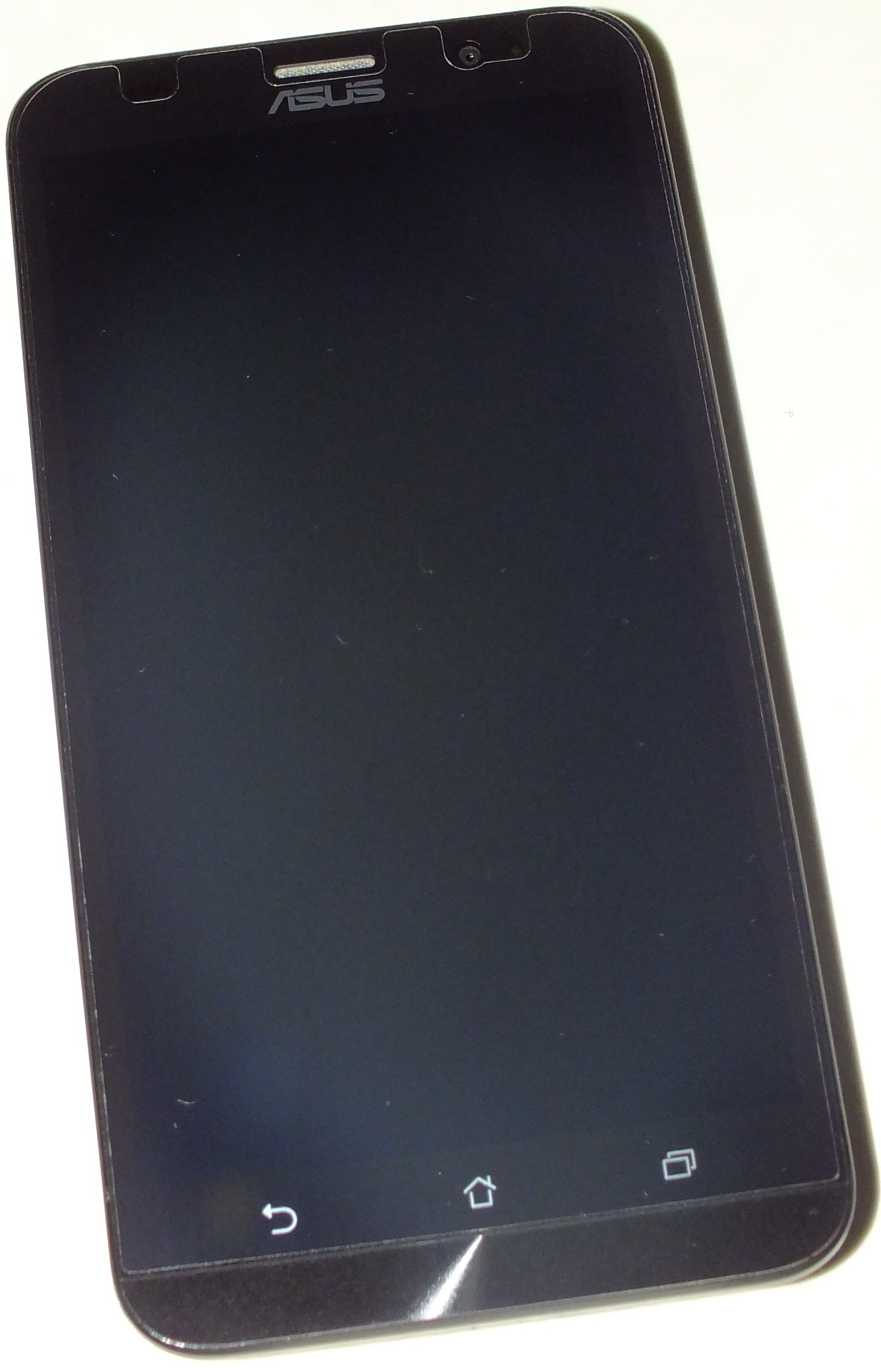
ZenFone 2 (ZE551ML) with 4 GB RAM

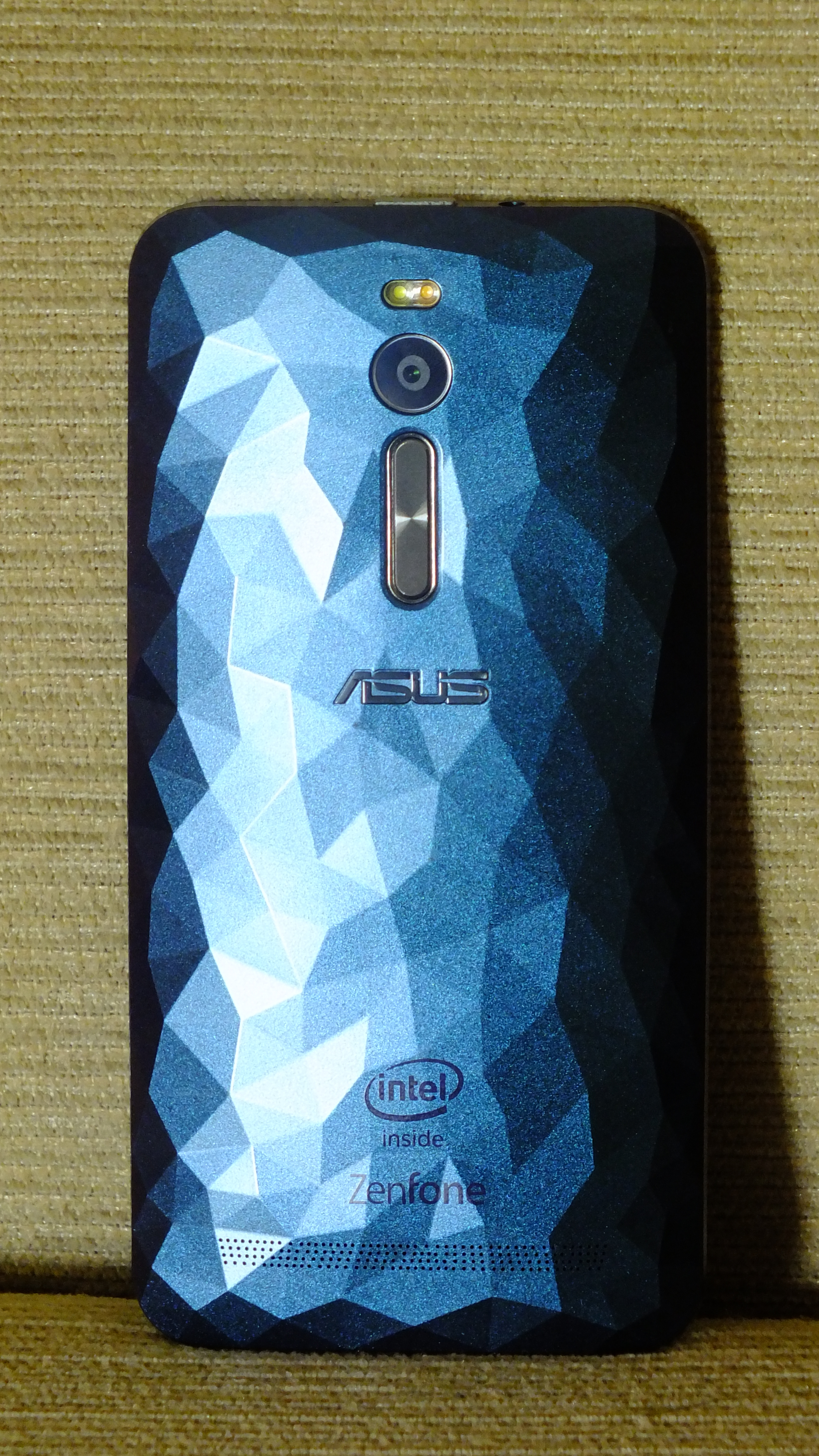
ZenFone 2 Deluxe (ZE551ML)

The ZenFone 2 was announced at CES 2015. The flagship phablet model (ZE551ML) launched with Android 5.0 Lollipop running ZenUI and has a 5.5" Full HD (1920×1080) IPS display. The phone is powered by Intel Atom Moorefield SoCs with up to 4 GB of RAM, a first for smartphones. The phone also includes dual MicroSIM card slots, 13/5 MP rear and front cameras, a non-removable 3000 mAh Lithium polymer battery, up to 16/32/64/128 GB of internal storage, and a MicroSD Card slot.

Additionally, Asus announced two other models of the Zenfone 2. The ZE550ML comes with a 5.5" HD (1280×720) IPS display, but otherwise features similar specifications to the ZE551ML. The ZE500CL, the low cost variant, comes with a 5" HD display, an Intel Atom Cloverview CPU, 2 GB of RAM, a single MicroSIM slot, 8/2 MP rear and front cameras, and a 2500 mAh battery.

The ZenFone 2 was launched in Taiwan on 9 March 2015 - followed by India, Japan, Indonesia and Thailand

In July 2015, the ZenFone 2E was released in the United States as an exclusive prepaid AT&T GoPhone.

Deluxe editions was released in September 2015. It is basically a ZE551ML with extended memory and a special back cover dubbed "Illusion Case", which has a 3D polygonal pattern that gives it a more premium look and feel than the original ZE551ML. Other markets offered the Deluxe Special Edition with red bezels, extended 256 GB of memory and Intel Atom Z3590 2.5 GHz processor. Colors offered are white and blue with purple shade, while the special edition available in silver or carbon fiber pattern. It is priced at around $299 for the deluxe edition and $469 for the special edition.

The ZenFone 2 won the 2015 iF product design award for top design in innovation, ergonomics, and functionality.

=== ZenFone Zoom ===
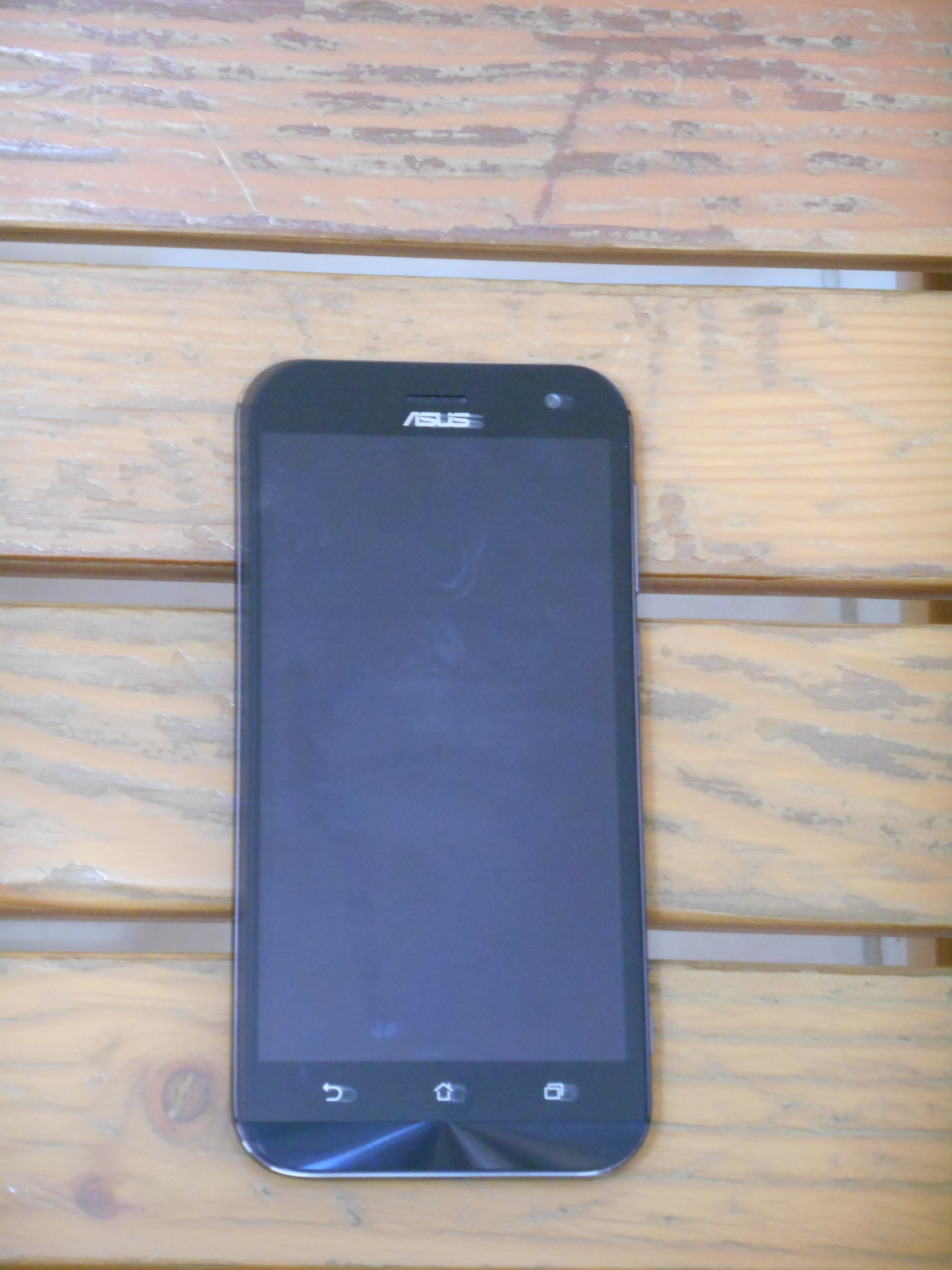
ZenFone Zoom Front

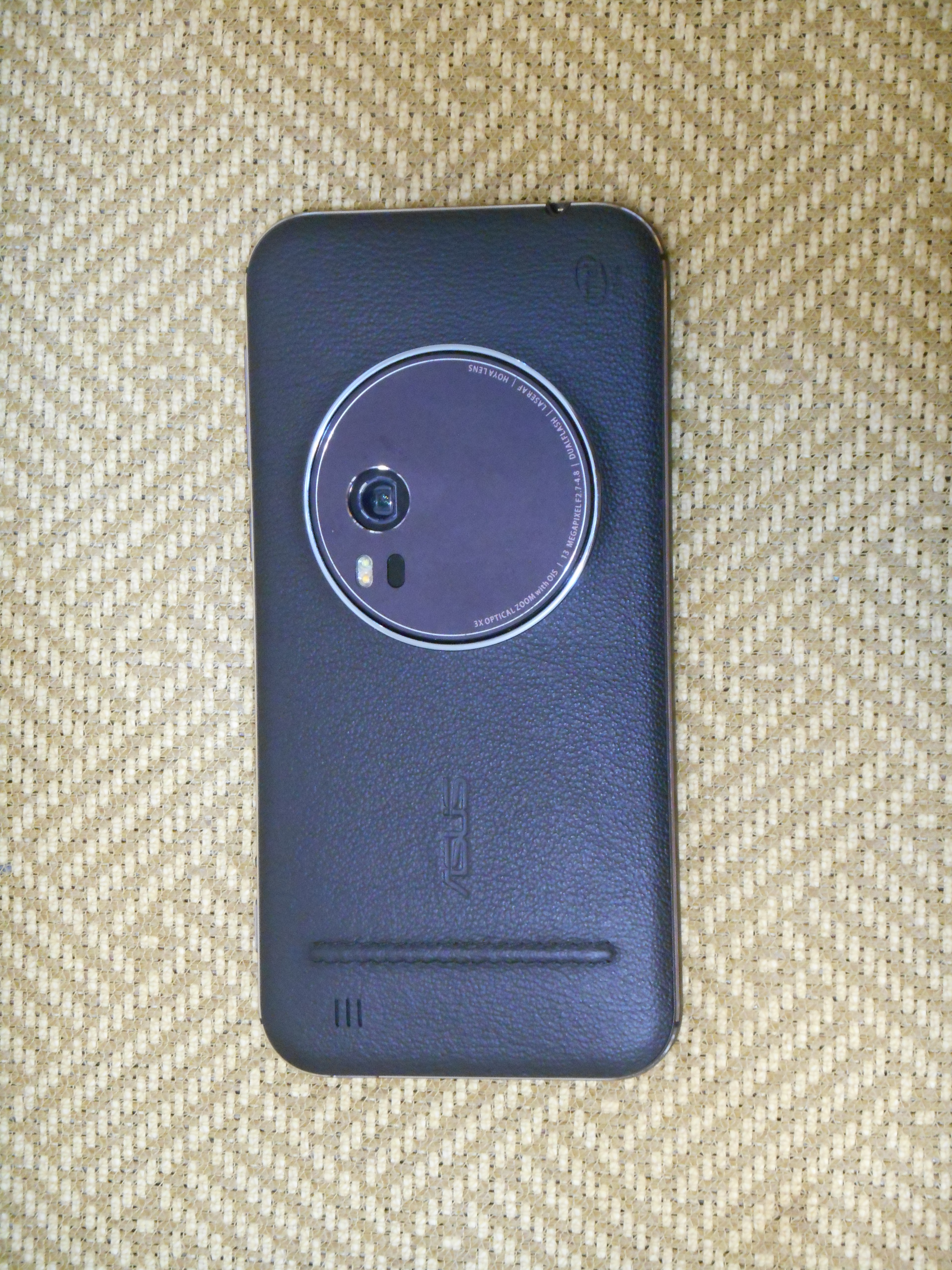
ZenFone Zoom rear

The ZenFone Zoom was announced at CES 2015 and along with the ZenFone 2, is one of the first phones to offer 4 GB of RAM. The specifications are largely the same as the Zenfone 2, with the exception of the camera. It has a 13 MP at the rear along with 3× optical zoom and 12× digital zoom, Real Tone Flash, optical image stabilization and laser auto-focus. It is priced at around US$399 for the 2 GB version.

=== Variants ===
| Model | Processor | Processor Architecture | RAM | GPU | Display | Camera | Internal Storage | Platform |
|---|---|---|---|---|---|---|---|---|
| Zenfone 2 Deluxe (ZE551ML) | Intel Atom Z3590 (2.5 GHz, quad-core); Intel Atom Z3580 (2.3 GHz, quad-core); Intel Atom Z3560 (1.8 GHz, quad-core) | x86 | 4 GB LPDDR3 | PowerVR G6430 | 5.5 inches, Full HD 1920×1080, IPS Corning Gorilla Glass 3 | 5 MP front 13 MP rear | 64 GB / 128 GB / 256 GB eMMC Flash | Android 5.0 Lollipop; upgradable to Android 6.0 Marshmallow |
| Zenfone 2 / Zenfone 2 Deluxe (ZE551ML) | Intel Atom Z3580 (2.3 GHz, quad-core); Intel Atom Z3560 (1.8 GHz, quad-core) | x86 | 2 GB / 4 GB LPDDR3 | PowerVR G6430 | 5.5 inches, Full HD 1920×1080, IPS Corning Gorilla Glass 3 | 5 MP front 13 MP rear | 16 GB / 32 GB / 64 GB / 128 GB eMMC Flash | Android 5.0 Lollipop; upgradable to Android 6.0 Marshmallow |
| Zenfone 2 (ZE550ML) | Intel Atom Z3560 (1.8 GHz, quad-core) | x86 | 2 GB LPDDR3 | PowerVR G6430 | 5.5 inches, HD 1280×720, IPS Corning Gorilla Glass 3 | 5 MP front 13 MP rear | 16 GB eMMC Flash | Android 5.0.2 Lollipop; upgradable to Android 6.0 Marshmallow |
| Zenfone Selfie (ZD551KL) | Qualcomm Snapdragon 615 (1.5 GHz + 1 GHz, octa-core) | ARM64 | 2 GB / 3 GB LPDDR3 | Adreno 405 | 5.5 inches, Full HD 1920×1080, IPS Corning Gorilla Glass 4 | 13 MP front 13 MP rear | 16 GB / 32 GB eMMC Flash | Android 5.0.2 Lollipop; upgradable to Android 6.0 Marshmallow |
| Zenfone Max (ZC550KL) | Qualcomm Snapdragon 410 (1.2 GHz, quad-core) | ARM64 | 2 GB LPDDR3 | Adreno 306 | 5.5 inches, HD 1280×720, IPS Corning Gorilla Glass 4 | 5 MP front 13 MP rear | 8 GB / 16 GB eMMC Flash | Android 5.0.2 Lollipop; upgradable to Android 6.0 Marshmallow |
| Zenfone 2 Laser (ZE601KL / ZE600KL) | Qualcomm Snapdragon 616 (octa-core) | ARM64 | 2 GB / 3 GB LPDDR3 | Adreno 405 | 6 inches, HD 1280x720 IPS Corning Gorilla Glass 4 | 5 MP front 13 MP rear | 16 GB / 32 GB eMMC Flash | Android 5.0 Lollipop; upgradable to Android 6.0 Marshmallow |
| Zenfone 2 Laser (ZE550KL / ZE551KL) | Qualcomm Snapdragon 410 MSM8916 (1.2 GHz, quad-core); Qualcomm Snapdragon 615 MSM8939 (octa-core) | ARM64 | 2 GB / 3 GB LPDDR3 | Adreno 306; Adreno 405 | 5.5 inches, HD 1280×720 295ppi (ZE550KL); Full HD 1920×1080 (ZE551KL), IPS Corning Gorilla Glass 4 | 5 MP front 13 MP rear | 16/32 GB eMMC Flash | Android 5.0 Lollipop; upgradable to Android 6.0 Marshmallow |
| Zenfone 2 Laser (ZE500KL / ZE500 kg) | Qualcomm Snapdragon 410 (1.2 GHz, quad-core) | ARM64 | 2 GB LPDDR2 | Adreno 306 | 5 inches, HD 1280×720, IPS Corning Gorilla Glass 4 | 5 MP front 13 MP rear | 16 GB eMMC Flash | Android 5.0.2 Lollipop; upgradable to Android 6.0 Marshmallow |
| Zenfone 2 (ZE500CL) | Intel Atom Z2560 (1.6 GHz, dual-core) | x86 | 2 GB LPDDR2 | PowerVR SGX544MP2 | 5 inches, HD 1280×720, IPS Corning Gorilla Glass 3 | 2 MP front 8 MP rear | 16 GB eMMC Flash | Android 5.0 Lollipop; upgradable to Android 6.0 Marshmallow |
| Zenfone 2E (Z00D) | Intel Atom Z2560 (1.6 GHz, dual-core) | x86 | 2 GB LPDDR2 | PowerVR SGX544MP2 | 5 inches, HD 1280×720, IPS Corning Gorilla Glass 3 | 2 MP front 8 MP rear | 8 GB eMMC Flash | Android 5.0 Lollipop; upgradable to Android 6.0 Marshmallow |
| Zenfone Go (ZC500TG) | MediaTek MT6580 (1.3 GHz, quad-core) | ARM64 | 2 GB LPDDR2 | Mali-400 MP | 5 inches, HD 1280×720, IPS Corning Gorilla Glass 4 | 2 MP front 8 MP rear | 8 GB / 16 GB eMMC Flash | Android 5.1 Lollipop |
| Zenfone C (ZC451CG) | Intel Atom Z2520 (1.2 GHz, dual-core) | x86 | 1 GB / 2 GB LPDDR2 | PowerVR SGX544MP2 | 4.5 inches, FWVGA 450×854, TFT | 0.3 MP front 5 MP rear | 8 GB eMMC Flash | Android 4.4 KitKat |
| Zenfone Zoom (ZX551ML) | Intel Atom Z3590 (2.5 GHz, quad-core) | x86 | 4 GB LPDDR3 | PowerVR G6430 | 5.5 inches, Full HD 1920x1080, IPS Corning Gorilla Glass 4 | 5 MP front 13 MP rear | 32 GB / 64 GB / 128 GB eMMC Flash | Android 5.0 Lollipop, upgradeable to Android 6.0 Marshmallow |

== Third generation (2016) ==
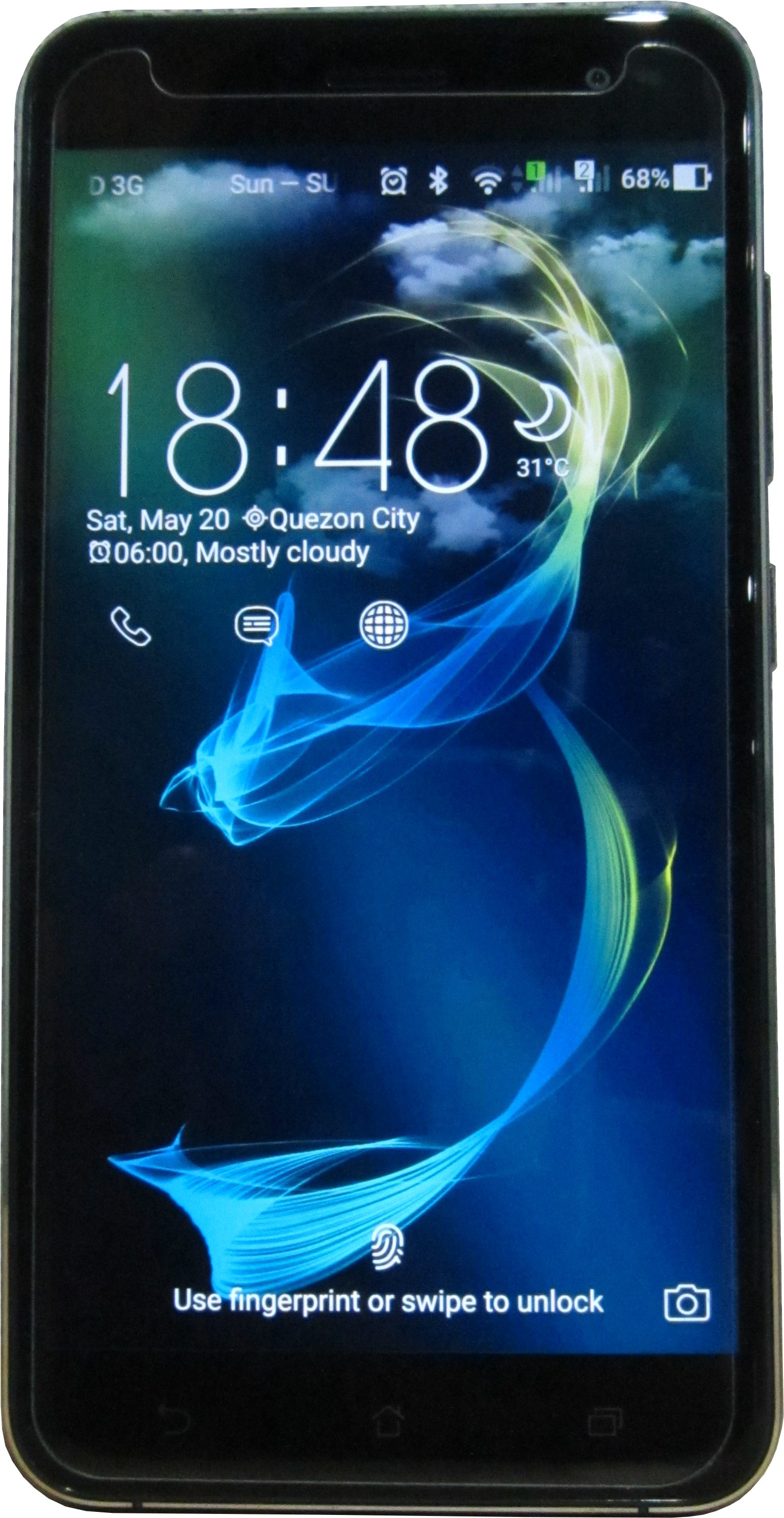
ZenFone 3 (ZE552KL)

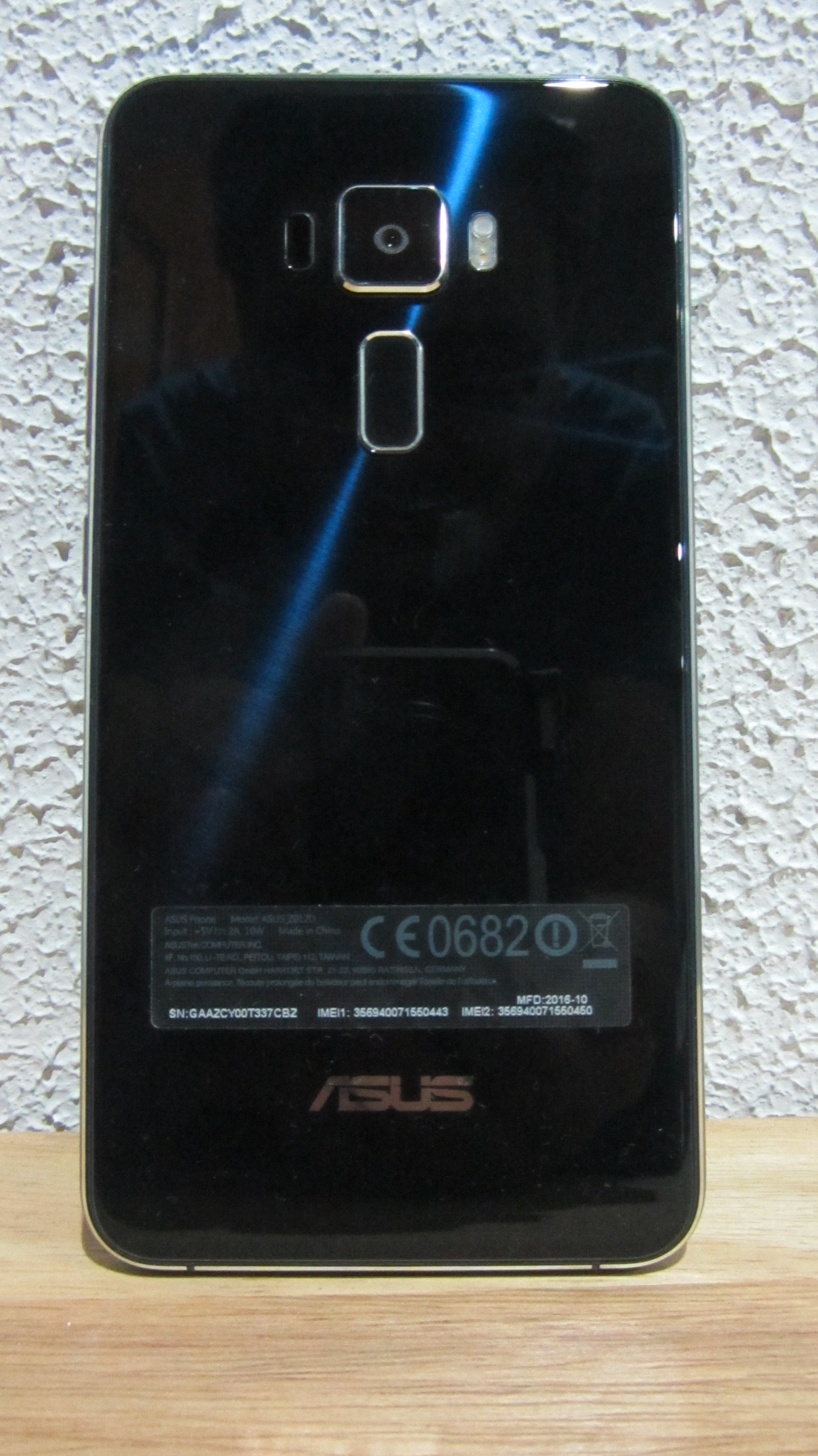
ZenFone 3 (ZE552KL)

=== ZenFone 3 ===
Asus unveiled the third generation ZenFone series at Computex Taipei on 30 May 2016. Some devices in the ZenFone 3 series (ZenFone 3 Max, ZenFone 3 Laser, ZenFone 3 Deluxe, and ZenFone 3 Ultra) use an aluminum frame body with no visible antenna lines and feature fingerprint sensors for easy unlocking. Each ZenFone 3 model has its own defining features. The ZenFone 3 uses 2.5D Corning Gorilla Glass on its front and rear panels. The ZenFone 3 Deluxe uses a Super AMOLED display and a Sony rear camera. The ZenFone 3 Ultra features a 4600mAh battery that can double as a powerbank for other devices with a 1.5A output. The ZenFone 3 Laser is notable for its low price, and the ZenFone 3 Max is notable for its large battery. The ZenFone 3, ZenFone 3 Deluxe, and ZenFone 3 Ultra use the USB Type-C connector. The third generation ZenFone series drops Intel while retaining Qualcomm and MediaTek as CPU suppliers.

=== ZenFone AR ===
First unveiled at CES 2017, the ZenFone AR is the first smartphone to support the Tango augmented reality and Google Daydream VR platforms and to be offered with 6 or 8 GB of RAM. The ZenFone AR is equipped with a 23 megapixel camera with optical hardware that takes advantage of Tango applications and extreme performance for gaming and data. The camera module is similar with Nokia N8, C7 and X7.

=== Variants ===
| Model | Processor | Processor Architecture | RAM | GPU | Display | Camera | Internal Storage | Battery | Platform |
|---|---|---|---|---|---|---|---|---|---|
| Zenfone 3 (ZE520KL) | Qualcomm Snapdragon 625 MSM8953 (2.0 GHz Cortex-A53 octa-core) | ARM | 3 GB / 4 GB LPDDR3 | Adreno 506 | 5.2 inches, Full HD 1920×1080, IPS Corning Gorilla Glass 3 | 8 MP front 16 MP rear Sony Exmor RS IMX298, Asus TriTech autofocus, 4K video | 32 GB / 64 GB eMCP | 2600 mAh | Android Marshmallow 6.0.1; upgradable to Android 8.0 Oreo with ZenUI 5.0 |
| Zenfone 3 (ZE552KL) | Qualcomm Snapdragon 625 MSM8953 (2.0 GHz Cortex-A53 octa-core) | ARM | 4 GB LPDDR3 | Adreno 506 | 5.5 inches, Full HD 1920×1080, IPS Corning Gorilla Glass 3 | 8 MP front 16 MP rear Sony Exmor RS IMX298, Asus TriTech autofocus, 4K video | 64 GB eMCP | 3000 mAh | Android Marshmallow 6.0.1; upgradable to Android 8.0 Oreo with ZenUI 5.0 |
| Zenfone 3 Deluxe (ZS550KL) | Qualcomm Snapdragon 625 MSM8953 (2.0 GHz Cortex-A53 octa-core) | ARM | 4 GB LPDDR3 | Adreno 506 | 5.5 inches, Full HD 1920×1080, IPS LCD Corning Gorilla Glass 4 | 8 MP front 16 MP rear camera with f2.0 aperture, Asus TriTech autofocus, 4K video | 64 GB | 3000 mAh | Android Marshmallow 6.0.1; upgradable to Android 8.0 Oreo with ZenUI 5.0 |
| Zenfone 3 Deluxe (ZS570KL) | Qualcomm Snapdragon 820 MSM8996 (2.15 GHz Kryo dual-core + 1.59 GHz Kryo dual-core) / Qualcomm MSM8996 Snapdragon 821 (2.4 GHz Kryo dual-core + 1.6 GHz Kryo dual-core) | ARM | 6 GB LPDDR4 | Adreno 530 | 5.7 inches, Full HD 1920×1080, Super AMOLED Corning Gorilla Glass 4 | 8 MP front 23 MP rear Sony Exmor RS IMX318 with f2.0 aperture, Asus TriTech autofocus, 4K video | 64 GB / 128 GB / 256 GB UFS 2.0 Flash | 3000 mAh | Android Marshmallow 6.0.1; upgradable to Android 8.0 Oreo with ZenUI 5.0 |
| Zenfone 3 Ultra (ZU680KL) | Qualcomm Snapdragon 652 MSM8976 (1.8 GHz Cortex-A72 quad-core + 1.4 GHz Cortex-A53 quad-core) | ARM | 3 GB / 4 GB LPDDR3 | Adreno 510 | 6.8 inches, Full HD 1920×1080, IPS Corning Gorilla Glass 4 | 8 MP front 23 MP rear Sony Exmor RS IMX318 with f2.0 aperture, Asus TriTech autofocus, 4K video | 32 GB / 64 GB / 128 GB eMMC | 4600 mAh | Android Marshmallow 6.0.1; upgradable to Android 8.0 Oreo with ZenUI 5.0 |
| Zenfone 3 Laser (ZC551KL) | Qualcomm Snapdragon 430 MSM8937 (1.4 GHz Cortex-A53 octa-core) | ARM | 2 GB / 3 GB LPDDR3 | Adreno 505 | 5.5 inches, Full HD 1920×1080, IPS | 5 MP front 13 MP rear Sony Exmor RS IMX214 | 32 GB UFS 2.0 Flash | 3000 mAh | Android Marshmallow 6.0.1; upgradable to Android 8.0 Oreo with ZenUI 5.0 |
| Zenfone 3 Max (ZC520TL) | Mediatek MT6737M (1.5 GHz Cortex-A53 Quad-core) | ARM | 2 GB / 3 GB LPDDR3 | Mali-T720MP2 | 5.2 inches, HD 1280x720, IPS | 5 MP front 13 MP rear | 16 GB / 32 GB UFS 2.0 Flash | 4100 mAh | Android Marshmallow 6.0.1; upgradable to Android 7.0 Nougat |
| Zenfone 3s Max (ZC521TL) | Mediatek MT6750 (1.5 GHz Cortex-A53 Octa-core) | ARM | 3 GB LPDDR3 | Adreno 405 | 5.2 inches, HD 1280x720, IPS | 8 MP front 13 MP rear | 32 GB UFS 2.0 Flash | 5000 mAh | Android 7.0 Nougat |
| Zenfone 3 Max (ZC553KL) | Qualcomm Snapdragon 430 MSM8937 (1.4 GHz Cortex-A53 Octa-core) | ARM | 3 GB LPDDR3 | Adreno 505 | 5.5 inches, FHD 1920x1280, IPS | 8 MP front 16 MP rear | 32 GB eMCP | 4100 mAh | Android Marshmallow 6.0.1; upgradable to Android 8.1 Oreo |
| Zenfone 3 Zoom (ZE553KL) (a.k.a. Zenfone Zoom S) | Qualcomm Snapdragon 625 MSM8953 (2.0 GHz Cortex-A53 octa-core) | ARM | 4 GB LPDDR3 | Adreno 506 | 5.5-inch, HD 1080x1920, AMOLED Corning Gorilla Glass 5 | 13 MP front Sony Exmor RS IMX214; 12 MP rear Sony Exmor RS IMX362 | 32 GB / 64 GB / 128 GB | 5000 mAh | Android Marshmallow 6.0.1; upgradable to Android 8.0 Oreo with ZenUI 5.0 |
| Zenfone AR (ZS571KL) | Qualcomm Snapdragon 821 MSM8996 (2x2.35 GHz Kryo & 2x1.6 GHz Kryo quad-core) | ARM | 4 GB / 8 GB LPDDR3 | Adreno 530 | 5.7-inch, HD 1440x2560, Super AMOLED Corning Gorilla Glass 4 | 8 MP front 23 MP rear | 64 GB / 128 GB / 256 GB | 3300 mAh | Android 7.0 Nougat |
| Zenfone Live (ZB501KL) | Qualcomm Snapdragon 410 MSM8916 (1.2 GHz Cortex-A53 quad-core) | ARM | 2 GB LPDDR | Adreno 306 | 5.0-inch, HD 720x1280, IPS Corning Gorilla Glass 4 | 5 MP front 13 MP rear | 16 GB / 32 GB | 2650 mAh | Android 6.0 Marshmallow |
| Zenfone Go (ZB500KL) | Qualcomm Snapdragon 410 MSM8916 (1.2 GHz Cortex-A53 quad-core) | ARM | 2 GB LPDDR | Adreno 306 | 5.0-inch, HD 720x1280, IPS Corning Gorilla Glass 4 | 5 MP front 13 MP rear | 16 GB | 2600 mAh | Android 6.0 Marshmallow |
| Zenfone Go (ZB552KL) | Qualcomm Snapdragon 410 MSM8916 (1.2 GHz Cortex-A53 quad-core) | ARM | 2 GB LPDDR | Adreno 306 | 5.5-inch, HD 720x1280, IPS Corning Gorilla Glass 4 | 5 MP front 13 MP rear | 16 GB / 32 GB | 3000 mAh | Android 6.0 Marshmallow |
| Zenfone Go (ZB500 kg) | Qualcomm Snapdragon 200 MSM8212 (1.2 GHz Cortex-A7 quad-core) | ARM | 1 GB LPDDR | Adreno 306 | 5.0-inch, HD 780x1280, IPS | 2 MP front 8 MP rear | 8 GB | 2600 mAh | Android 5.1 Lollipop |
| Zenfone Go (ZB551KL) | Qualcomm Snapdragon 400 MSM8916 (1.4 GHz Cortex-A7 quad-core) | ARM | 1 GB LPDDR | Adreno 306 | 5.5-inch, HD 1080x1920, IPS Corning Gorilla Glass 3 | 5 MP front 13 MP rear | 16 GB | 3010 mAh | Android 5.1 Lollipop |
| Zenfone Go (ZB690 kg) | Qualcomm Snapdragon 200 MSM8212 (1.2 GHz Cortex-A7 quad-core) | ARM | 1 GB LPDDR | Adreno 306 | 6.9-inch, HD 600x1024, IPS Corning Gorilla Glass 3 | 2 MP front 8 MP rear | 8 GB | 3480 mAh | Android 5.1 Lollipop |

== Fourth generation (2017) ==
Asus announced the fourth generation ZenFone on August 17, 2017 (August 18, 2005 in RD). The line went under the name "ZenFone 4", which was previously used for the 4" and 4.5" variants of the first generation line. The main feature of the flagship ZenFone 4 is its dual lens camera, which enables wide-angle photography.

=== Variants ===
| Model | Processor | Processor Architecture | RAM | GPU | Display | Camera | Internal Storage | Battery | Platform |
|---|---|---|---|---|---|---|---|---|---|
| Zenfone 4 (ZE554KL) | Qualcomm Snapdragon 660 (octa-core); Qualcomm Snapdragon 630 (4x2.2 GHz Cortex-A53 & 4x1.8 GHz Cortex-A53 octa-core) | ARM | 4 GB / 6 GB LPDDR3 | Adreno 512; Adreno 508 | 5.5 inches, Full HD 1920×1080, IPS Corning Gorilla Glass 4 | 8 MP front Dual 12 MP + 8 MP rear Sony Exmor RS IMX362, Asus TriTech autofocus, 2160p, 4K UHD 3840×2160 video | 64 GB eMCP storage | 3300 mAh | Android 7.0 Nougat; upgradable to Android 8.0 Oreo with ZenUI 5.0 |
| Zenfone 4 Pro (ZS551KL) | Qualcomm Snapdragon 835 MSM8998 (4x2.35 GHz Kryo 280 & 4x1.9 GHz Kryo 280 octa-core) | ARM | 6 GB LPDDR3 | Adreno 540 | 5.5 inches, Full HD 1920×1080, Super AMOLED Corning Gorilla Glass 4 | 8 MP front Dual 12 MP + 16 MP rear Sony, Asus TriTech autofocus, 2160p, 4K UHD 3840×2160 video | 64 GB / 128 GB / 256 GB UFS 2.1 | 3600 mAh | Android 7.0 Nougat; upgradable to Android 8.0 Oreo with ZenUI 5.0 |
| Zenfone 4 Selfie Pro (ZD552KL) | Qualcomm Snapdragon 625 MSM8953 (2.0 GHz Cortex-A53 octa-core) | ARM | 3 GB / 4 GB LPDDR3 | Adreno 506 | 5.5 inches, Full HD 1920×1080, Super AMOLED Corning Gorilla Glass 4 | Dual 24 MP + 5 MP front Sony Exmor RS IMX362, 4K UHD 3840×2160 video 16 MP rear Sony, Asus TriTech autofocus, 4K UHD 3840×2160 video | 64 GB eMCP | 3000 mAh | Android 7.0 Nougat; upgradable to Android 8.0 Oreo with ZenUI 5.0 |
| Zenfone 4 Selfie (ZD553KL) | Qualcomm Snapdragon 430 MSM8937 (4x1.4 GHz Cortex-A53 + 4x1.1 GHz Cortex A53 octa-core) | ARM | 4 GB LPDDR3 | Adreno 505 | 5.5 inches, HD 1280×720, IPS Corning Gorilla Glass | Dual 20 MP + 8 MP front 16 MP rear, Asus TriTech autofocus, 1080p | 64 GB eMCP | 3000 mAh | Android 7.0 Nougat; upgradable to Android 8.0 Oreo with ZenUI 5.0 |
| ZenFone 4 Selfie Lite (ZB520KL) | Qualcomm Snapdragon 425 MSM8917 (1.4 GHz Cortex-A53 quad-core) | ARM | 3 GB LPDDR3 | Adreno 308 | 5.3 inches, HD 1280×720, IPS Corning Gorilla Glass | 16 MP front 16 MP rear, Asus TriTech autofocus, 1080p | 32 GB eMCP | 4120 mAh | Android 7.0 Nougat; upgradable to Android 8.0 Oreo with ZenUI 5.0 |
| Zenfone 4 Max (ZC554KL) | Qualcomm Snapdragon 430 MSM8937 (4x1.4 GHz Cortex-A53 + 4x1.1 GHz Cortex A53 octa-core) | ARM | 3 GB LPDDR3 | Adreno 505 | 5.5 inches, HD 1280x720, IPS Corning Gorilla Glass | 8 MP front Dual 13 MP rear, Asus TriTech autofocus, 1080p | 32 GB eMCP | 5000 mAh Li-Po | Android 7.0 Nougat; upgradable to Android 8.0 Oreo with ZenUI 5.0 |
| Zenfone 4 Max Pro (ZC554KL) | Qualcomm Snapdragon 430 MSM8937 (4x1.4 GHz Cortex-A53 + 4x1.1 GHz Cortex A53 octa-core) | ARM | 3 GB LPDDR3 | Adreno 505 | 5.5 inches, HD 1280x720, IPS Corning Gorilla Glass | 16 MP front Dual 16 MP rear, PDAF, 1080p | 32 GB eMCP | 5000 mAh Li-Po | Android 7.0 Nougat; upgradable to Android 8.0 Oreo with ZenUI 5.0 |
| Zenfone 4 Max Plus (ZC554KL) | Qualcomm Snapdragon 425 MSM8917 (1.4 GHz Cortex-A53 quad-core) | ARM | 3 GB LPDDR3 | Adreno 308 | 5.5 inches, HD 1280x720, IPS Corning Gorilla Glass | 8 MP front Dual 13 MP + 5 MP rear, Asus TriTech autofocus, 1080p | 32 GB eMCP | 5000 mAh Li-Po | Android 7.0 Nougat; upgradable to Android 8.0 Oreo with ZenUI 5.0; upgradable to Android 9 Pie |
| Zenfone 4 Max (ZC520KL) | Qualcomm Snapdragon 425 MSM8917 (1.4 GHz Cortex-A53 quad-core) | ARM | 2 GB LPDDR3 | Adreno 308 | 5.2 inches, HD 1280x720, IPS Corning Gorilla Glass | 8 MP front Dual 13 MP + 5 MP rear, Asus TriTech autofocus, 1080p | 32 GB eMCP | 4100 mAh Li-Po | Android 7.0 Nougat with ZenUI 4.0; upgradable to Android 8.0 Oreo with ZenUI 5.0 |
| Zenfone Max Plus (M1) (ZB570TL) | MediaTek MT6750T (4x1.5 GHz Cortex-A53 + 4x1.0 GHz Cortex A53 octa-core) | ARM | 3 GB LPDDR3 | Mali-T860MP2 | 5.7 inches, HD 2160x1080, IPS Corning Gorilla Glass | 8 MP front Dual 16 MP + 8 MP rear, Asus TriTech autofocus, 1080p | 32 GB eMCP | 4130 mAh Li-Po | Android 7.0 Nougat with ZenUI 4.0; upgradable to Android 8.1 Oreo with ZenUI 5.0 |
| Zenfone V (V520KL) | Qualcomm Snapdragon 820 MSM8996 (2x2.15 GHz Kryo & 2x1.6 GHz Kryo quad-core) | ARM | 4 GB LPDDR3 | Adreno 530 | 5.2 inches, Full HD 1920×1080, Super AMOLED Corning Gorilla Glass | 8 MP front 23 MP, Asus TriTech autofocus, 2160p, 4K UHD 3840×2160 video | 32 GB eMCP | 3000 mAh | Android 7.0 Nougat with ZenUI 4.0; upgradable to Android 8.0 Oreo with ZenUI 5.0 |

== Fifth generation (2018) ==
Asus unveiled the fifth generation ZenFone at the 2018 Mobile World Congress in Barcelona. The ZenFone 5 has a screen size of 6.2" with a 19:9 aspect ratio and bears a resemblance to the iPhone X. According to Asus, the new phone will have 10 new AI features.

=== Variants ===
| Model | Processor | Processor Architecture | RAM | GPU | Display | Camera | Internal Storage | Battery | Platform |
|---|---|---|---|---|---|---|---|---|---|
| Zenfone 5Z (ZS620KL) | Qualcomm Snapdragon MSM8998 845 (4x2.7 GHz Kryo 385 Gold & 4x1.7 GHz Kryo 385 Silver octa-core) | ARM | 4 GB / 6 GB / 8 GB LPDDR4 | Adreno 630 | 6.2 inches, Full HD 2246×1080, IPS Corning Gorilla Glass | 8 MP front, 1080p Dual 12 MP + 8 MP rear, Asus TriTech autofocus, 2160p, 4K UHD 3840×2160 video | 64/128/256GB UFS 2.1 | 3300 mAh | Android 8.0 Oreo with ZenUI 5.0; upgradable to Android 10 with ZenUI 7 |
| Zenfone 5 (ZE620KL) | Qualcomm Snapdragon SDM636 (4x1.8 GHz Kryo 260 Gold + 4x1.6 GHz Kryo 260 Silver octa-core) | ARM | 4 GB / 6 GB LPDDR4 | Adreno 509 | 6.2 inches, Full HD 2246×1080, IPS Corning Gorilla Glass | 8 MP front, 1080p Dual 12 MP + 8 MP rear, Asus TriTech autofocus, 2160p, 4K UHD 3840×2160 video | 64 GB eMCP | 3300 mAh | Android 8.0 Oreo with ZenUI 5.0; upgradable to Android 9 Pie with ZenUI 6 |
| Zenfone 5 Lite / 5Q (ZC600KL) | Qualcomm Snapdragon SDM630 (2.2 GHz Cortex-A53 octa-core); Qualcomm MSM8937 430 (4x1.4 GHz Cortex-A53 + 4x1.1 GHz Cortex A53 octa-core) | ARM | 3 GB / 4 GB LPDDR3 | Adreno 508; Adreno 505 | 6.0 inches, Full HD 2160×1080, IPS Corning Gorilla Glass | Dual 20 MP front, 1080p Dual 16 MP rear, Asus TriTech autofocus, 2160p, 4K UHD 3840×2160 video | 32 GB/64 GB eMCP | 3300 mAh | Android 7.1.1 Nougat; upgradable to Android 9 Pie with ZenUI 6 |
| Zenfone Max Pro (M1) (ZB602KL) | Qualcomm Snapdragon 636 (Octa-core 1.8 GHz) Processor. | ARM | 3 GB / 4 GB / 6 GB LPDDR4X | Adreno 509 | 5.99-inch Full HD+ 2160 x 1080 pixel IPS LCD | 8 MP front (16 MP (6 GB Variant)); 13 MP + 5 MP rear (16 MP + 5 MP (6 GB Variant)), PDAF, 2160p video | 32 GB / 64 GB | 5000 mAh | Android 8.1 Oreo; upgradable to Android 10; also supports Ubuntu Touch |
| Zenfone Max (M1) (ZB556KL) | Qualcomm Snapdragon 430 (Octa-core 1.4 GHz Cortex-A53) Processor. | ARM | 3 GB LPDDR3 | Adreno 505 | 5.45-inch HD+ 1440 x 720 pixel IPS LCD | 8 MP front, 1080p 13 MP rear rear, autofocus, 1080p video | 32 GB eMCP | 4000 mAh | Android 8.0 Oreo with ZenUI 5 |
| Zenfone Max (M1) (ZB555KL) | Qualcomm Snapdragon 430 (Octa-core 1.4 GHz Cortex-A53) Processor. | ARM | 2 GB / 3 GB LPDDR3 | Adreno 505 | 5.45-inch HD+ 1440 x 720 pixel IPS LCD | 8 MP or 13 MP front, 1080p 13 MP + 8 MP rear rear, autofocus, 1080p video | 32 GB eMCP | 4000 mAh | Android 8.0 Oreo with ZenUI 5 |
| Zenfone Max (M1) (ZB555KL) | Qualcomm Snapdragon 425 MSM8917 (1.4 GHz Cortex-A53 quad-core) | ARM | 2 GB LPDDR3 | Adreno 308 | 5.45-inch HD+ 1440 x 720 pixel IPS LCD | 8 MP or 13 MP front, 1080p 13 MP + 8 MP rear rear, autofocus, 1080p video | 16 GB eMCP | 4000 mAh | Android 8.0 Oreo with ZenUI 5 |
| Zenfone Max Pro (M2) (ZB630KL) | Qualcomm Snapdragon 660 (Octa-core 2.2 GHz) Processor. | ARM | 3 GB / 4 GB / 6 GB | Adreno 512 | 6.26-inch Full HD+ 1080 x 2280 pixels IPS LCD | 13 MP front 12 MP + 5 MP rear, PDAF, 2160p video | 64 GB / 128 GB storage | 5000 mAh | Android 8.1 Oreo; upgradable to Android 9 Pie |
| Zenfone Max (M2) (ZB633KL) | Qualcomm Snapdragon 632 (Octa-core) Processor. | ARM | 3 GB / 4 GB | Adreno 505 | 6.3-inch HD+ 720 x 1520 pixels IPS LCD | 8 MP front 13 MP + 2 MP rear, PDAF, 2160p video | 32 GB / 64 GB storage | 4000 mAh | Android 8.1 Oreo; upgradable to Android 9 Pie |

== Sixth generation (2019) ==
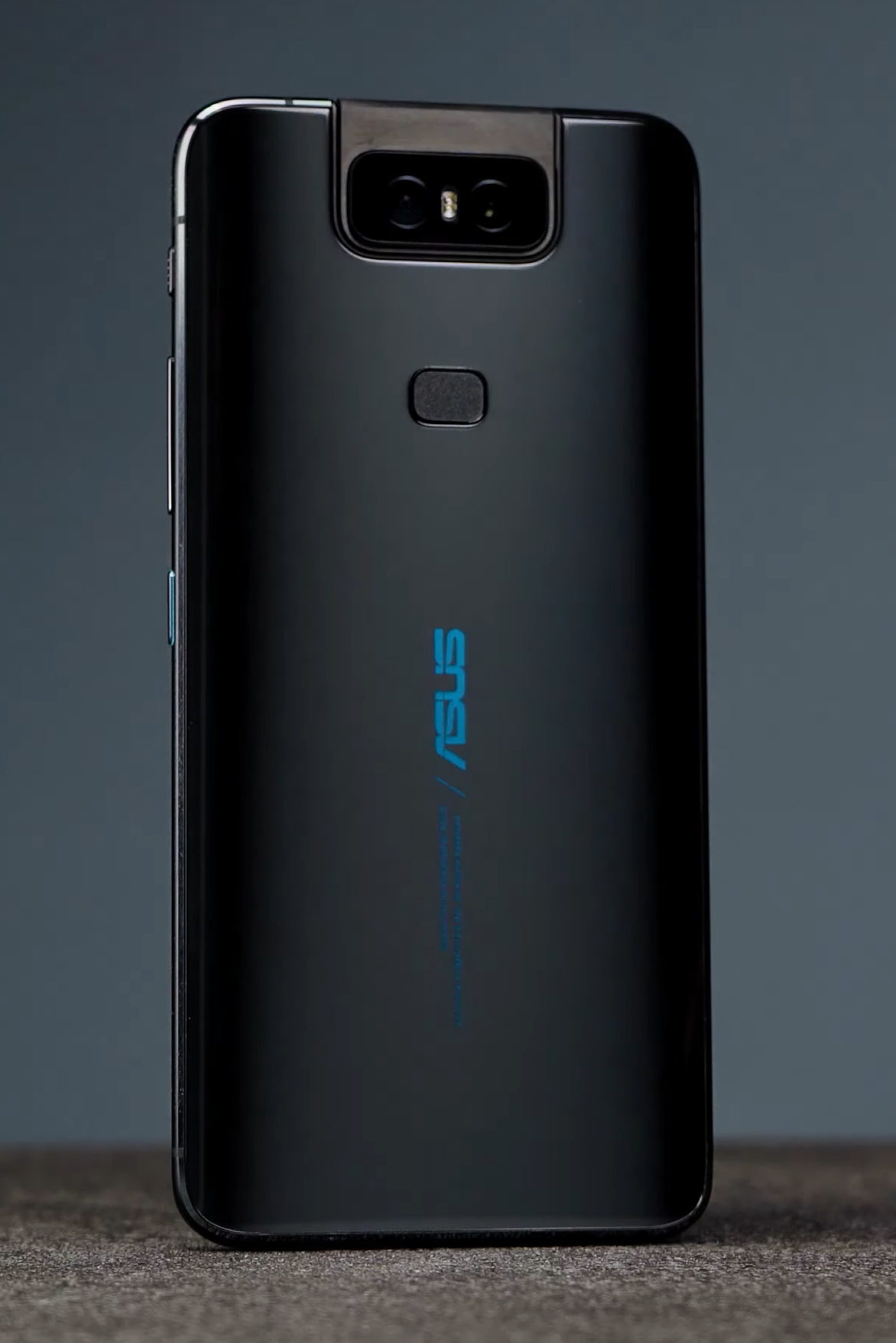
The Asus ZenFone 6 (Asus 6Z) in Midnight Black

In May 2019, Asus unveiled the ZenFone 6 (Asus 6Z) at a press event in Spain. The ZenFone 6 features a rotating camera in an attempt to reduce bezels and provide an all-screen front. There is a dual camera setup on the phone, which normally resides on the back, but rotates when needed to become a selfie shooter. Asus allows for the rotation of the Liquidmetal camera module to be controlled using a stepper motor. This allows users to stop the rotation midway to take photos at interesting angles and can take automatic panoramas. The company has also added fall-protection for the camera module, which will automatically retract the camera to its base position if the phone detects sudden movement.

The Asus ZenFone 6 prices starts at EUR 499 for the 6 GB + 64 GB variant, going up to 6 GB + 128 GB version will retail at EUR 559, and finally, the top-end 8 GB + 256 GB variant is priced at EUR 599. It was immediately available via the Asus eShop on that day and would start shipping from May 25. Asus has revealed that the phone will be offered in two colours – Midnight Black and Twilight Silver.

The ZenFone 6 was announced to be released in India on 19 June 2019 under the name Asus 6Z, due to a trademark ruling by the Delhi High Court against the sale of products branded "Zen" or "ZenFone" in conflict with Telecare Network India's Zen Mobile.

=== Variants ===
| Model | Processor | Processor Architecture | RAM | GPU | Display | Camera | Internal Storage | Battery | Platform |
|---|---|---|---|---|---|---|---|---|---|
| ZenFone 6 (Asus 6Z) (ZS630KL) | Qualcomm Snapdragon SDM855 (1x2.84 GHz Kryo 485 + 3x2.41 GHz Kryo 485 + 4x1.78 GHz Kryo 485 octa-core) | ARM | 6 GB / 8 GB LPDDR4 RAM | Adreno 640 | 6.4 inches, Full HD 2340×1080, IPS Corning Gorilla Glass 6, 3D Curved Glass with NMT technology | 48 MP, 26 mm (wide) + 13 MP, 11 mm (ultrawide) motorized flip-up main camera module, Sony IMX586 1/2.0" sensor, 2160p, 4K UHD 3840×2160 video | 128 GB / 256 GB UFS 2.1 storage | 5000 mAh | Android 9 Piewith ZenUI 6; upgradable to Android 11with ZenUI 8 |

== Seventh generation (2020) ==
Asus revealed the ZenFone 7 and 7 Pro in August 2020 as the first ZenFone devices to support 5G while omitting the audio jack. The 7 is primarily differentiated from the 7 Pro by chipsets and memory options. Both phones retain the previous generation's rotating camera benefiting from a new motor. The module is larger and now houses a triple camera setup with the addition of a 3x zoom telephoto lens. The main sensor has been upgraded to 64 MP and can record video at 8K resolution. The ZenFone 7's display increases to 6.67 inches and switches to an AMOLED panel with a 90 Hz refresh rate. The fingerprint sensor has been repositioned from the back panel to the right edge, and is integrated with the power button. The battery capacity remains the same at 5000 mAh, but has faster 30 W charging. Both run on Android 10 using ZenUI 7.

=== Variants ===
| Model | Processor | Processor Architecture | RAM | GPU | Display | Camera | Internal Storage | Battery | Platform |
|---|---|---|---|---|---|---|---|---|---|
| ZenFone 7 (ZS670KS) | Qualcomm Snapdragon SDM865 (1x2.84 GHz Kryo 585 + 3x2.42 GHz Kryo 585 + 4x1.8 GHz Kryo 585 octa-core) | ARM | 6 GB / 8 GB LPDDR5 RAM | Adreno 650 | 6.67 inches, Full HD 2400×1080, 90 Hz AMOLED Corning Gorilla Glass 6, 3D Curved Glass with NMT technology | 64 MP, 26 mm (wide) + 12 MP, 11 mm (ultrawide) + 8 MP, 80 mm (3x telephoto) motorized flip-up main camera module, Sony IMX686 1/1.72" sensor, 4320p, 8K UHD 7680×4320 video | 128 GB UFS 3.1 storage | 5000 mAh | Android 10 with ZenUI 7; upgradable to Android 12 with ZenUI |
| ZenFone 7 Pro (ZS671KS) | Qualcomm Snapdragon SDM865+ (1x3.1 GHz Kryo 585 + 3x2.42 GHz Kryo 585 + 4x1.8 GHz Kryo 585 octa-core) | ARM | 8 GB LPDDR5 RAM | Adreno 650 | 6.67 inches, Full HD 2400×1080, 90 Hz AMOLED Corning Gorilla Glass 6, 3D Curved Glass with NMT technology | 64 MP, 26 mm (wide) + 12 MP, 11 mm (ultrawide) + 8 MP, 80 mm (3x telephoto) motorized flip-up main camera module, Sony IMX686 1/1.72" sensor, 4320p, 8K UHD 7680×4320 video | 256 GB UFS 3.1 storage | 5000 mAh | Android 10 with ZenUI 7; upgradable to Android 12 with ZenUI |

== Eighth generation (2021) ==
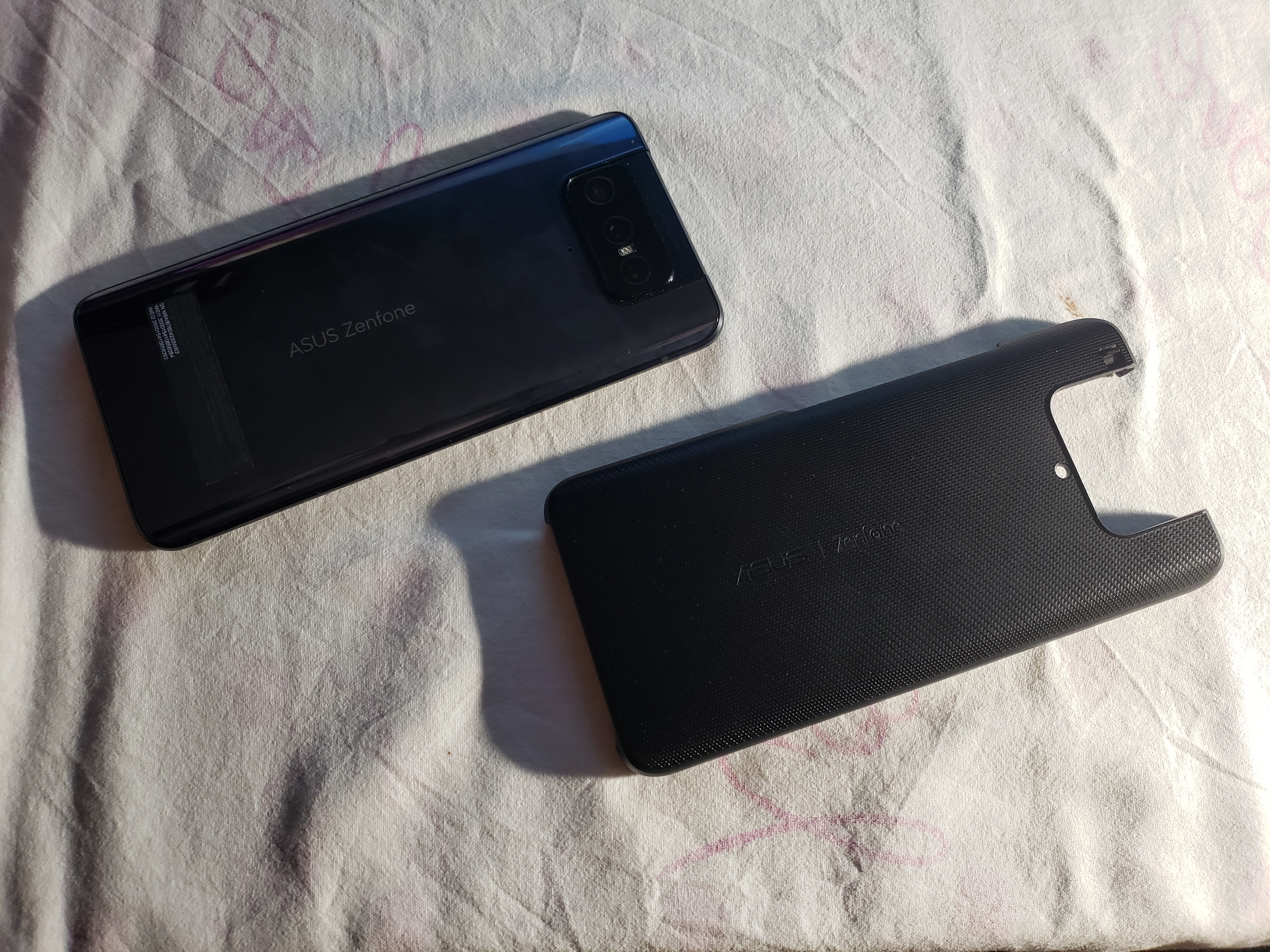
The Asus ZenFone 8 Flip next to its included case

On 12 May 2021, ASUS has announced ZenFone 8 (also known as Asus 8z in India) and ZenFone 8 Flip under the slogan "Big on Performance. Compact in Size." They are released later on 13 May 2021, features a Qualcomm Snapdragon 888 5G chipset, with Corning Gorilla Glass 6 (Victus in base ver.) protection and they support 5G. Their display design Samsung Super AMOLED screen with 120 Hz (90 Hz in Flip ver.) of refresh rate. ZenFone 8 Flip retains the current previous generation's camera but with improved performance, similar to ZenFone 8 compact. ZenFone 8 (also known as ZenFone 8 compact, ZenFone 8 mini) returns the cameras back to the same as ZenFone 5 (2018), but has Infinity-O display with 64 MP + 12 MP rear cameras similar to ZenFone 5. It has a 4000 mAh battery and includes IP68 water resistance and a fingerprint sensor on display.

=== Variants ===
| Model | Processor | Processor Architecture | RAM | GPU | Display | Camera | Internal Storage | Battery | Platform |
|---|---|---|---|---|---|---|---|---|---|
| ZenFone 8 (Asus 8z) (ZS590KS) | Qualcomm Snapdragon 888 5G with Octa-core (1x2.84 GHz Kryo 680 + 3x2.42 GHz Kryo 680 + 4x1.8 GHz Kryo 680) CPU | ARM | 6 GB / 8 GB / 16 GB LPDDR5 RAM | Adreno 660 | 5.9 inches, Full HD 1080×2400, 120 Hz Super AMOLED Corning Gorilla Glass Victus, HDR10+ | 64 MP, 26 mm (wide-angle back) + 12 MP, 14 mm (ultrawide back) + 12 MP, 28 mm (standard front), Sony IMX686 1/1.73" sensor, 4320p, 8K UHD 7680×4320 video | 128 GB / 256 GB UFS 3.1 storage | 4000 mAh | Android 11 with ZenUI 8; upgradable to Android 13 with ZenUI |
| ZenFone 8 Flip (ZS672KS) | Qualcomm Snapdragon 888 5G with Octa-core (1x2.84 GHz Kryo 680 + 3x2.42 GHz Kryo 680 + 4x1.8 GHz Kryo 680) CPU | ARM | 8 GB LPDDR5 RAM | Adreno 660 | 6.67 inches, Full HD 1080×2400, 90 Hz Super AMOLED Corning Gorilla Glass 6, HDR10+, 1000 nits brightness (peak), 3D Curved Glass with NMT technology | 64 MP, 26 mm (wide) + 12 MP, 11 mm (ultrawide) + 8 MP, 80 mm, 3x optical zoom, 12x hybrid zoom (telephoto) motorized flip-up main camera module, Sony IMX686 1/1.73" sensor, 4320p, 8K UHD 7680×4320 video | 128 GB / 256 GB UFS 3.1 storage (Removable storage: microSDXC) | 5000 mAh | Android 11 with ZenUI 8; upgradable to Android 13 with ZenUI |

== Ninth generation (2022) ==
| Model | Processor | Processor Architecture | RAM | GPU | Display | Camera | Internal Storage | Battery | Platform |
|---|---|---|---|---|---|---|---|---|---|
| ZenFone 9 (AI2202) | Qualcomm Snapdragon 8+ Gen 1 with Octa-core (1x3.19 GHz Cortex-X2 + 3x2.75 GHz Cortex-A710 + 4x1.8 GHz Cortex-A510) CPU | ARM | 6 GB / 8 GB / 16 GB LPDDR5 RAM | Adreno 730 | 5.9 inches, Full HD 1080×2400, 120 Hz Super AMOLED Corning Gorilla Glass Victus, HDR10+ | 50 MP, 24 mm (wide-angle back) + 12 MP, 14 mm (ultrawide back) + 12 MP, 28 mm (standard front), Sony IMX766 1/1.56" sensor, 4320p, 8K UHD 7680×4320 video | 128 GB / 256 GB UFS 3.1 storage | 4300 mAh | Android 12 with ZenUI; upgradable to Android 14 with ZenUI |

== Tenth generation (2023) ==
Dimensions are H 146.5mm W 68.1mm D 9.4mm.

| Model | Processor | Processor Architecture | RAM | GPU | Display | Camera | Internal Storage | Battery | Platform |
|---|---|---|---|---|---|---|---|---|---|
| ZenFone 10 (AI2302) | Qualcomm Snapdragon 8 Gen 2 with Octa-core (1x3.2 GHz Cortex-X3 + 2x2.8 GHz Cortex-A715 + 2x2.8 GHz Cortex-A710 + 3x2 GHz Cortex-A510) CPU | ARM | 8 GB / 16 GB LPDDR5X RAM | Adreno 740 | 5.92 inches, Full HD 1080×2400, 144 Hz Super AMOLED Corning Gorilla Glass Victus, HDR10+ | 50 MP, 24 mm (wide-angle back) + 13 MP (ultrawide back) + 32 MP (standard front), Sony IMX766 1/1.56" sensor, 4320p, 8K UHD 7680×4320 video | 128 GB / 256 GB UFS 4.0 storage | 4300 mAh | Android 13 with ZenUI; upgradable to Android 15 with ZenUI |

== Eleventh generation (2024) ==
On 14 March 2024, ASUS has announced ZenFone 11 Ultra under the slogan "Expand Your Vision.", this time, ASUS only released one model, the aforementioned ZenFone 11 Ultra, dropping the small-sized phones due to poor sales coming from its predecessor. The phone was released to the market on 14 April 2024, with a Qualcomm Snapdragon 8 Gen 3 chipset, with Corning Gorilla Glass Victus 2 protection and support for 5G networks. The phone's display is an LTPO AMOLED screen with 120 Hz refresh rate that can scale down to 1 Hz at the barest minimum of standby time. Compared to its predecessor, the ZenFone 11 Ultra adds a 3x telephoto camera lens that was absent from the ZenFone 10 and trades in the gimbal sensors for a more unified block of camera sensors. It has a 5500 mAh battery and includes IP68 water resistance and an in-display fingerprint sensor, which was last seen on ZenFone 8 Flip.

| Model | Processor | Processor Architecture | RAM | GPU | Display | Camera | Internal Storage | Battery | Platform |
|---|---|---|---|---|---|---|---|---|---|
| ZenFone 11 Ultra (AI2401) | Qualcomm Snapdragon 8 Gen 3 with Octa-core (1x3.3 GHz Cortex-X4 + 3x3.2 GHz Cortex-A720 + 2x3 GHz Cortex-A720 + 2x2.3 GHz Cortex-A520) CPU | ARM | 12 GB / 16 GB LPDDR5X RAM | Adreno 750 | 6.78 inches, Full HD 1080×2400, 144 Hz LTPO AMOLED Corning Gorilla Glass Victus 2, HDR10 | 50 MP, 24 mm (wide-angle back) + 13 MP, 13 mm (ultrawide back) + 32 MP, 65 mm (3x telephoto) + 32 MP, 22 mm (standard front), Sony IMX890 1/1.56" sensor, 4320p, 8K UHD 7680×4320 video | 256 GB / 512 GB UFS 4.0 storage | 5500 mAh | Android 14 with ZenUI; upgradable to Android 16 with ZenUI |

== Twelfth generation (2025) ==
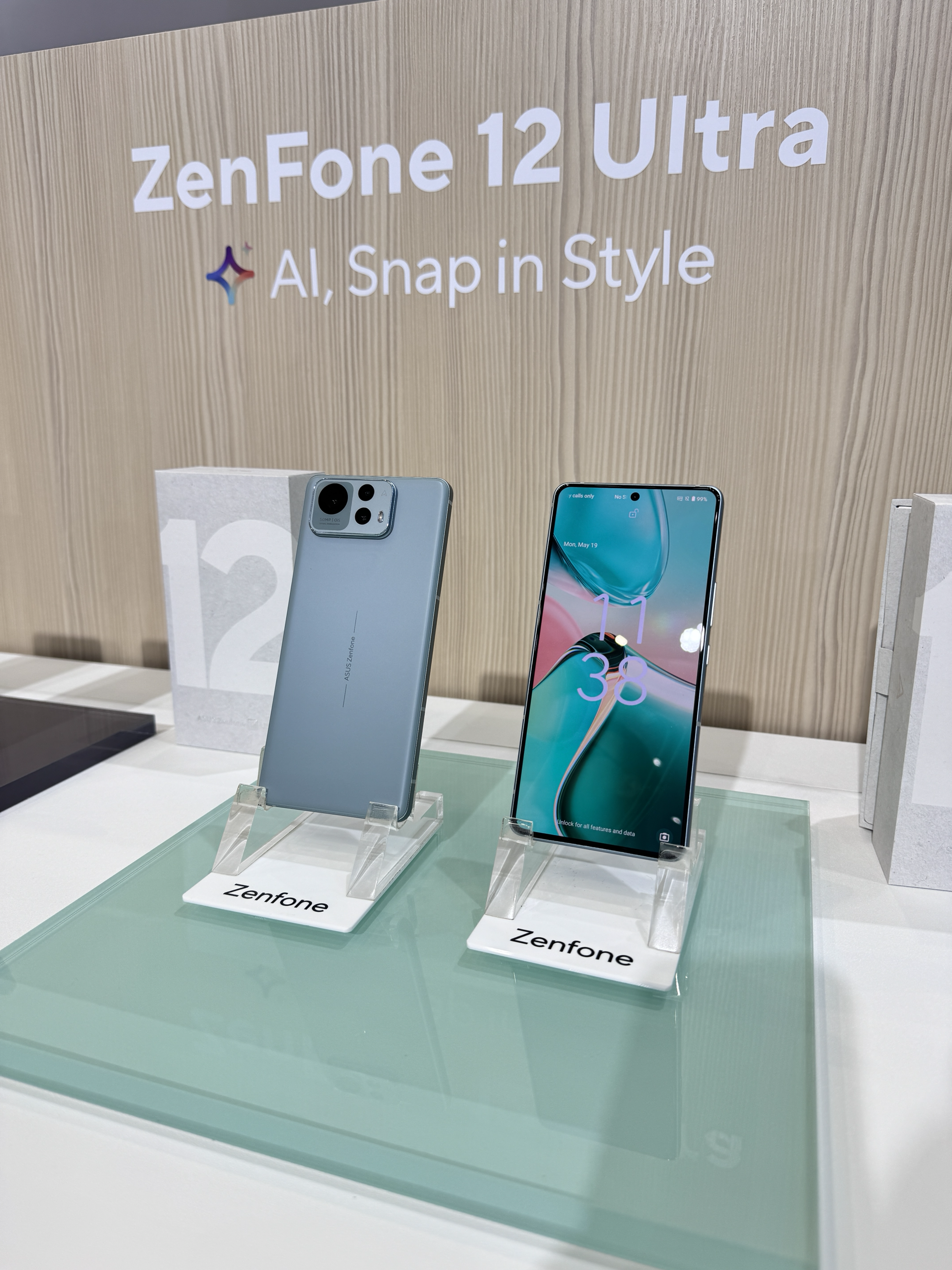
Asus ZenFone 12 Ultra store display

Asus released its 12th generation of the Zenfone series, the Zenfone 12 Ultra, on 6 February 2025. This generation is demonstrating its AI camera capability as the product tagline is "AI, Snap in Style." Just like previous Zenfone generations, the Zenfone 12 Ultra is also equipped with the latest Qualcomm chipset, the Snapdragon 8 Elite, which powers its AI features in all aspects. It also has a Dual AI System, with both cloud AI and on-device AI, which allows the device to automatically run all those AI features online, offline, or sometimes combining both at the same time.

| Model | Processor | Processor Architecture | RAM | GPU | Display | Camera | Internal Storage | Battery | Platform |
|---|---|---|---|---|---|---|---|---|---|
| ZenFone 12 Ultra (AI2501) | Qualcomm Snapdragon 8 Elite with Octa-core (2x4.32 GHz Oryon V2 Phoenix L + 6x3.53 GHz Oryon V2 Phoenix M) CPU | ARM | 12 GB / 16 GB LPDDR5X RAM | Adreno 750 | 6.78 inches, Full HD 1080×2400, 144 Hz LTPO AMOLED Corning Gorilla Glass Victus 2, HDR10 | 50 MP, 24 mm (wide-angle back) + 13 MP, 13 mm (ultrawide back) + 32 MP, 65 mm (3x telephoto) + 32 MP, 22 mm (standard front), Sony IMX906 1/1.56" sensor, 4320p, 8K UHD 7680×4320 video | 256 GB / 512 GB UFS 4.0 storage | 5500 mAh | Android 15 with ZenUI; upgradable to Android 16 with ZenUI |
