= Asus ZenFone 7 =

2020 Asus flagship smartphones with flip camera

ZenFone 7

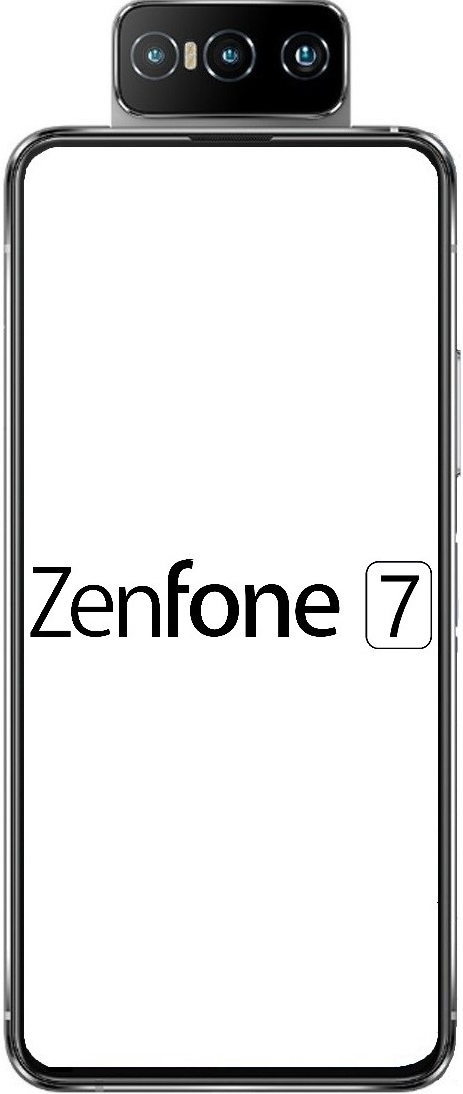
- Brand: Asus ZenFone
- Manufacturer: AsusTek Computer Inc.
- Type: Phablet
- Series: Asus ZenFone
- First released: 1 September 2020; 6 years ago
- Predecessor: ZenFone 6
- Successor: ZenFone 8
- Compatible networks: 2G, 3G, 4G, 4G LTE, 5G
- Form factor: Slate
- Dimensions: H: 165.1 mm (6.50 in), W: 77.3 mm (3.04 in), D: 9.6 mm (0.38 in)
- Weight: 230 g (8.1 oz)
- Operating system: Android 10 with ZenUI 7
- System-on-chip: Qualcomm Snapdragon 865; Qualcomm Snapdragon 865+
- CPU: Octa-core (1×2.84-3.1 GHz, 3×2.42 GHz, 4×1.8 GHz) Kryo 585
- GPU: 2×512 ALUs, 587 MHz, Adreno 650
- Modem: Dual SIM, Snapdragon X24 LTE, Gigabit-Class LTE, Cat19, 5CA, 4x4 MIMO, Up to 31 LTE bands, 12 5G bands SA/NSA
- Memory: 6/8 GB LPDDR5 RAM
- Storage: UFS 3.1 128/256 GB
- Removable storage: microSDXC up to 2 TB, SIM contacts and SMS
- Battery: 3.8 V 19 Wh (5,000 mAh) non-removable lithium polymer battery
- Charging: USB-C Power Delivery 3.0 up to 30 W; USB-C OTG reverse charging up to 10 W
- Rear camera: Wide: Sony Exmor IMX686 64 MP 1/1.72” (0.8 µm) Quad Bayer sensor, ƒ/1.8 aperture, 79° FOV, 26 mm equivalent, 6p lens, 2×1 OCL, OIS, PDAF, Laser AF; Ultra-wide: Sony Exmor IMX363, 12 MP 1/2.55" (1.4 µm), ƒ/2.2 aperture, 113° FOV, 17 mm equivalent, dual pixel PDAF, fixed-focus, distortion correction; Telephoto: 8 MP, ƒ/2.4 aperture, 80 mm equivalent, PDAF, OIS, 3x optical zoom; Modes: Dual-LED flash, Auto HDR, (Auto) Panorama, Portrait, Super Night, long exposure, AI scene detection, filters, Pro/RAW (main only); Video: up to 8K UHD at 30 fps, 4K UHD at 30/60 fps, 1080p at 30/60 fps, 3-axis EIS, slow-motion video (4K at 120 fps, 1080p at 240 fps, 720p at 480 fps), Motion Tracking, timelapse; OIS limited to ZenFone 7 Pro
- Front camera: Motorised flip-up rear camera
- Display: 6.67 in (169 mm) Super AMOLED capacitive touchscreen, 16M colors, 20:9 2400 × 1080 px (2.5 mp), 395 ppi (155.5 px/cm), 700 nits, HDR10+, Infinite CR, 90 Hz refresh rate, 110% DCI-P3/96% NTSC
- Sound: 192 kHz/24-bit Hi-Res audio, DTS:X Ultra 1.0 7.1-channel virtual surround, Dual NXP TFA9874 amplifiers, Stereo speakers, USB Audio Device digital audio via USB-C, aptX Adaptive/SBC Bluetooth A2DP, ERM vibration motor
- Connectivity: USB 2.0 Type-C, Wi-Fi 6 802.11 a/b/g/n/ac/6 2x2 MIMO, Wi-Fi Direct/hotspot, Bluetooth 5.0 EDR, NFC
- Data inputs: Accelerometer, gyroscope (supports ARCore), magnetometer, ambient light sensor, face recognition, triple microphones, Hall sensor, laser autofocus, side fingerprint scanner, GPS/GLONASS/BDS/GALILEO/QZSS/NavIC navigation, FM radio
- Model: ZS670KS; ZS671KS
- Codename: Asus S670
- Hearing aid compatibility: M4, T4
- Made in: Taiwan
- Other: Gorilla Glass 6 display, Gorilla Glass 3 back, Liquid Metal camera housing, aluminium frame
- Website: www.asus.com/Phone/ZenFone-7-ZS670KS

The ZenFone 7 and ZenFone 7 Pro are Android-based smartphones manufactured, released and marketed by Asus. The phones were unveiled on 26 August 2020, and succeed the ZenFone 6.

== Introduction ==
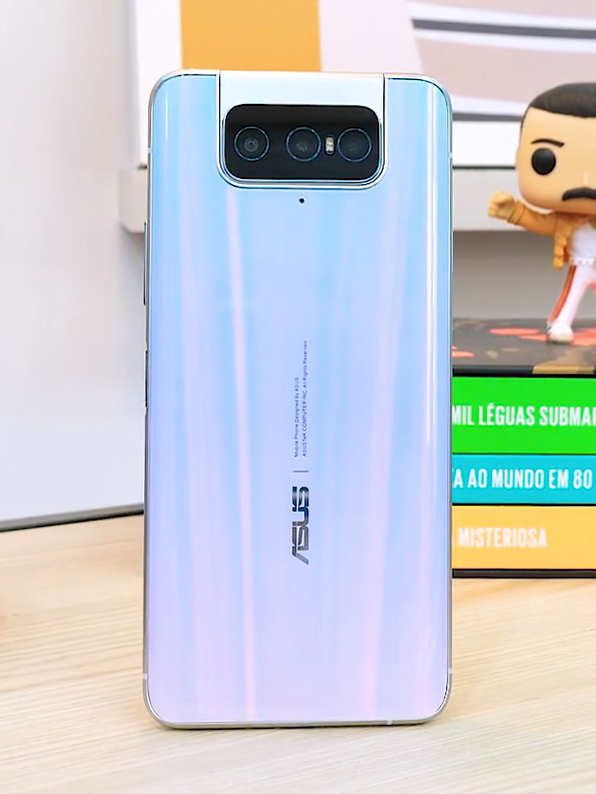
The next-generation ZenFone 7 Pro in Pastel White

On 26 August 2020, Asus launched the ZenFone 7 series in a Mandarin online press conference from their Taiwan headquarters. The ZenFone 7 series consists of the ZenFone 7 and ZenFone 7 Pro, retaining the hallmark flip-up camera form factor of the ZenFone 6 with the addition of a 3x telephoto camera, Sony IMX686 main sensor, 8K video recording capabilities, improved actuation mechanism, and optical image stabilisation exclusive to the Pro model. The ZenFone 7 series features a 6.67-inch 90 Hz AMOLED display with 200 Hz touch sampling and a 5G-capable Snapdragon 865 system on a chip, with the higher-clocked Snapdragon 865 Plus on the Pro model. Other changes include the removal of the headphone jack, ZenUI 7, 30W fast charging, combined side-mounted fingerprint scanner–power button–smart key, UFS 3.1 storage, three-microphone array utilising Nokia OZO Audio processing, and a larger and heavier overall form factor. The ZenFone 7 and 7 Pro are priced starting at NT$21,990 and NT$27,990, respectively. The ZenFone 7 series will not be available in North America because of a lack of 5G band support.

Preceded by ZenFone 6	ZenFone 7 ZenFone 7 Pro; 7th generation	Succeeded by ZenFone 8 ZenFone 8 Flip
