= Asus ZenFone 8 =

2021 Asus flagship smartphone

Asus ZenFone 8 Asus ZenFone 8 Flip
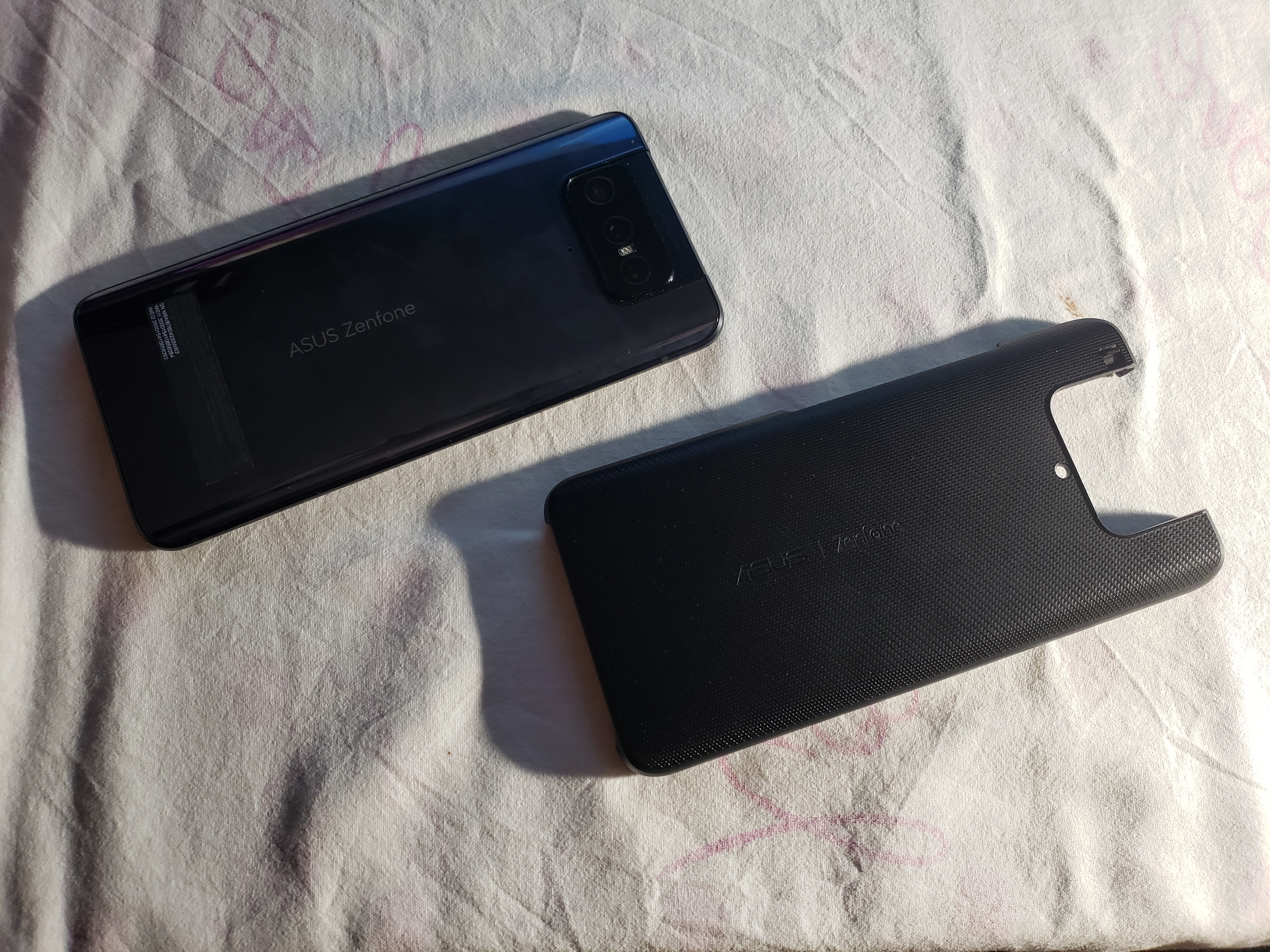
- The ZenFone 8 Flip next to its included case
- Also sold as: Asus 8z (in India), ZenFone 8 Compact
- Manufacturer: Asus
- Type: Smartphone
- Series: Asus ZenFone
- First released: May 12, 2021; 5 years ago
- Predecessor: Asus ZenFone 7
- Successor: Asus ZenFone 9
- Compatible networks: GSM / HSPA / LTE / 5G
- Form factor: Slate
- Dimensions: ZenFone 8: 148 × 68.5 × 8.9 mm (5.83 × 2.70 × 0.35 in); ZenFone 8 Flip: 165 × 77.3 × 9.6 mm (6.50 × 3.04 × 0.38 in)
- Weight: ZenFone 8: 169 g (6.0 oz); ZenFone 8 Flip: 230 g (8.1 oz)
- Operating system: Android 11, upgradable to Android 13, ZenUI
- System-on-chip: Qualcomm Snapdragon 888 5G (5 nm)
- CPU: Octa-core (1x2.84 GHz Kryo 680 & 3x2.42 GHz Kryo 680 & 4x1.80 GHz Kryo 680)
- GPU: Adreno 660
- Modem: Qualcomm Snapdragon X60 5G
- Memory: 6 GB, 8 GB, 12 GB, 16 GB RAM
- Storage: 128 GB, 256 GB UFS 3.1
- SIM: Dual SIM (Nano-SIM, dual stand-by)
- Battery: ZenFone 8: 4000 mAh; ZenFone 8 Flip: 5000 mAh
- Charging: Fast charging 30W
- Rear camera: ZenFone 8: 64 MP, f/1.8, 26mm wide, 1/1.73", 0.8μm, PDAF, OIS 12 MP, f/2.2, 112˚, 14mm ultrawide, 1/2.55", 1.4μm, dual pixel PDAF LED flash, HDR, panorama 8K@24fps, 4K@30/60/120fps, 1080p@30/60/240fps, 720p@480fps; gyro-EIS, HDR; ZenFone 8 Flip: 64 MP, f/1.8, 26mm wide, 1/1.73", 0.8μm, PDAF 8 MP, f/2.4, 80mm telephoto, PDAF, 3x optical zoom 12 MP, f/2.2, 112˚, 14mm ultrawide, 1/2.55", 1.4μm, dual pixel PDAF Dual-LED flash, HDR, auto panorama (motorized rotation) 8K@30fps, 4K@30/60/120fps, 1080p@30/60/240fps, 720p@480fps, gyro-EIS, HDR
- Front camera: 12 MP, f/2.5, 28mm standard, 1/2.93", 1.22μm, dual pixel PDAF; 4K@30fps, 1080p@30/60fps
- Display: 5.9 in (150 mm), 84.0 cm2 (~82.9% screen-to-body ratio); 2400 x 1080 pixels, 20:9 aspect ratio (~446 ppi density); Super AMOLED, 120Hz refresh rate, HDR10+, 700 nits (HBM), 1100 nits (peak); Always-on display
- Sound: Loudspeaker, 3.5mm jack
- Connectivity: Wi-Fi 802.11 a/b/g/n/ac/6e, dual-band, Wi-Fi Direct, hotspot Bluetooth 5.2, A2DP, LE, aptX HD, aptX Adaptive dual-band A-GPS, GLONASS, GALILEO, BDS, QZSS, NavIC; NFC, FM radio
- Data inputs: USB Type-C 2.0; Sensors: Accelerometer; Fingerprint scanner (under display, optical); Compass; Gyroscope; Proximity sensor
- Water resistance: IP68 dust/water resistant (up to 1.5m for 30 mins)
- Website: www.asus.com/Mobile/Phones/ZenFone/Zenfone-8/

The Asus ZenFone 8 (known as Asus 8z in India) and Asus ZenFone 8 Flip are Android-based smartphones designed, developed and manufactured by Asus as part of its Asus ZenFone series. They were announced on 12 May 2021.

== History ==
On 12 May 2021, Asus announced ZenFone 8 and ZenFone 8 Flip under the slogan "Big on Performance. Compact in Size." They were released later on 13 May 2021, featuring a Qualcomm Snapdragon 888 5G chipset, with Corning Gorilla Glass 6 (Victus in Compact ver.) protection and they support 5G. Their display design is Samsung Super AMOLED screen with 120 Hz (90 Hz in Flip ver.) of refresh rate. ZenFone 8 Flip retains the current previous generation's camera but with improved performance, similar to ZenFone 8. ZenFone 8 returns the cameras back to the same as ZenFone 5 (2018), but has Infinity-O display with 64 MP + 12 MP rear cameras similar to ZenFone 5. It has a 4000 mAh battery and includes IP68 water resistance and a fingerprint sensor on display.

On 13 May Asus announced the ZenFone 8 and ZenFone 8 Pro, which were announced and sold in Hong Kong on the same day. The devices were launched on 28 May in Malaysia.

=== Variants ===
Model	Processor	Processor Architecture	RAM	GPU	Display	Camera	Internal storage	Battery	Platform
Asus ZenFone 8 (ZS590KS)	Qualcomm Snapdragon 888 5G with Octa-core (1x2.84 GHz Kryo 680 + 3x2.42 GHz Kryo 680 + 4x1.8 GHz Kryo 680) CPU	ARM	6 GB / 8 GB / 16 GB LPDDR5 RAM	Adreno 660	5.9 inches, Full HD 2400×1080, 120 Hz Super AMOLED Corning Gorilla Glass Victus, HDR10+	64 MP, 26 mm (wide-angle back) + 12 MP, 14 mm (ultrawide back) + 12 MP, 28 mm (standard front), Sony IMX686 1/1.73" sensor, 4320p, 8K UHD 7680×4320 video	128 GB / 256 GB UFS 3.1 storage (Removable storage: 8 compact: No, 8 Flip: microSDXC)	4000 mAh	Android 11 with ZenUI 8
Asus ZenFone 8 Flip (ZS672KS)	Qualcomm Snapdragon 888 5G with Octa-core (1x2.84 GHz Kryo 680 + 3x2.42 GHz Kryo 680 + 4x1.8 GHz Kryo 680) CPU	ARM	8 GB LPDDR5 RAM	Adreno 660	6.67 inches, Full HD 2400×1080, 90 Hz Super AMOLED Corning Gorilla Glass 6, HDR10+, 1000 nits brightness (peak), 3D Curved Glass with NMT technology	64 MP, 26 mm (wide) + 12 MP, 11 mm (ultrawide) + 8 MP, 80 mm, 3x optical zoom, 12x hybrid zoom (telephoto) motorized flip-up main camera module, Sony IMX686 1/1.73" sensor, 4320p, 8K UHD 7680×4320 video	128 GB / 256 GB UFS 3.1 storage (Removable storage: 8 compact: No, 8 Flip: microSDXC)	5000 mAh	Android 11 with ZenUI 8

Preceded by ZenFone 7	ZenFone 8 ZenFone 8 Flip; 8th generation	Succeeded by ZenFone 9
