= Asus ZenFone Live =

Entry-level 2017 Android smartphone by Asus

Asus ZenFone Live ZB501KL
- Manufacturer: Asus
- Type: Smartphone
- Series: ZenFone Live
- Family: ZenFone
- First released: February 23, 2017; 9 years ago
- Predecessor: Asus ZenFone Go ZB500KL
- Successor: Asus ZenFone Live (L1)
- Related: Asus ZenFone 3
- Compatible networks: GSM, 3G, 4G LTE
- Form factor: Slate
- Colors: Navy blue; Gold; Rose gold
- Dimensions: H: 141.2 mm W: 71.7 mm D: 8 mm
- Weight: 120 g (4 oz)
- Operating system: Android 6.0.1 Marshmallow + ZenUI 3.0
- System-on-chip: Qualcomm MSM8916 Snapdragon 410 (28 nm)
- CPU: Quad-core 1.2 GHz Cortex-A53
- GPU: Adreno 306
- Memory: 2 GB LPDDR3
- Storage: 16/32 GB eMMC 4.5
- Removable storage: microSDXC up to 256 GB
- SIM: Dual SIM (Nano-SIM)
- Battery: Non-removable, Li-Ion 2650 mAh
- Rear camera: 13 MP, f/2.0, AF; LED flash, HDR, panorama Video: 1080p@30fps
- Front camera: 5 MP, f/2.2, 1.4 µm, AF; LED flash
- Display: IPS LCD, 5", 1280 × 720 (720p), 16:9 ratio, 294 ppi
- Sound: Mono sound
- Connectivity: microUSB 2.0 (OTG), 3.5 mm audio jack, Bluetooth 4.0 (A2DP, LE), FM radio Wi-Fi 802.11 b/g/n (Wi-Fi Direct), A-GPS, GLONASS
- Data inputs: Capacitive multitouch, 2 microphones, accelerometer, proximity, compass
- Model: A007

The Asus ZenFone Live (stylized as ASUS Zenfone Live) is an entry-level Android smartphone developed and marketed by Asus. It is the successor to the Asus ZenFone Go ZB500KL and was unveiled on February 23, 2017 in India.

== Design ==
The front panel is made of glass, while the body is constructed from plastic with a metallic finish.

The bottom of the device houses the loudspeaker, a micro-USB port, and the primary microphone. The top features a secondary microphone and a 3.5 mm audio jack. The SIM tray, which supports two SIM cards and a memory card, is located on the left side, while the volume rocker and power button are positioned on the right. The back panel features the main camera lens, an LED flash, and the brand logo. The front panel includes an LED flash, the earpiece speaker, the front-facing camera lens, an ambient light sensor, and a proximity sensor.

The ZenFone Live was available in the following colors:

Color	Name
	Navy Black
	Shimmer Gold
	Rose Gold

== Specifications ==
=== Hardware ===
The ZenFone Live is powered by an entry-level Qualcomm Snapdragon 410 system on a chip. It features 2 GB of RAM and is available with either 16 GB or 32 GB of internal flash memory storage. The storage can be expanded by up to 256 GB via a microSD card.

The device is equipped with a non-removable 2650 mAh lithium-ion battery.

The 5-inch IPS LCD display features an HD resolution (1280 × 720), a 16:9 aspect ratio, and a pixel density of 294 ppi.

The rear camera consists of a 13 megapixel lens with an f/2.0 aperture and autofocus (AF), capable of recording video at up to 1080p at 30 frames per second. The front-facing camera has a 5 MP lens with an f/2.2 aperture and autofocus.

=== Software ===
The ZenFone Live launches with Android 6.0.1 Marshmallow customized with Asus's proprietary ZenUI 3.0 user interface. A key software feature is BeautyLive, a mobile application designed to apply real-time skin-smoothing and facial-enhancement filters during live broadcasts on platforms such as YouTube, Instagram, and Facebook.

== See also ==
- Asus ZenFone
