= Asus ZenFone 5 =

Android smartphone series

Asus ZenFone 5 (2014 series)
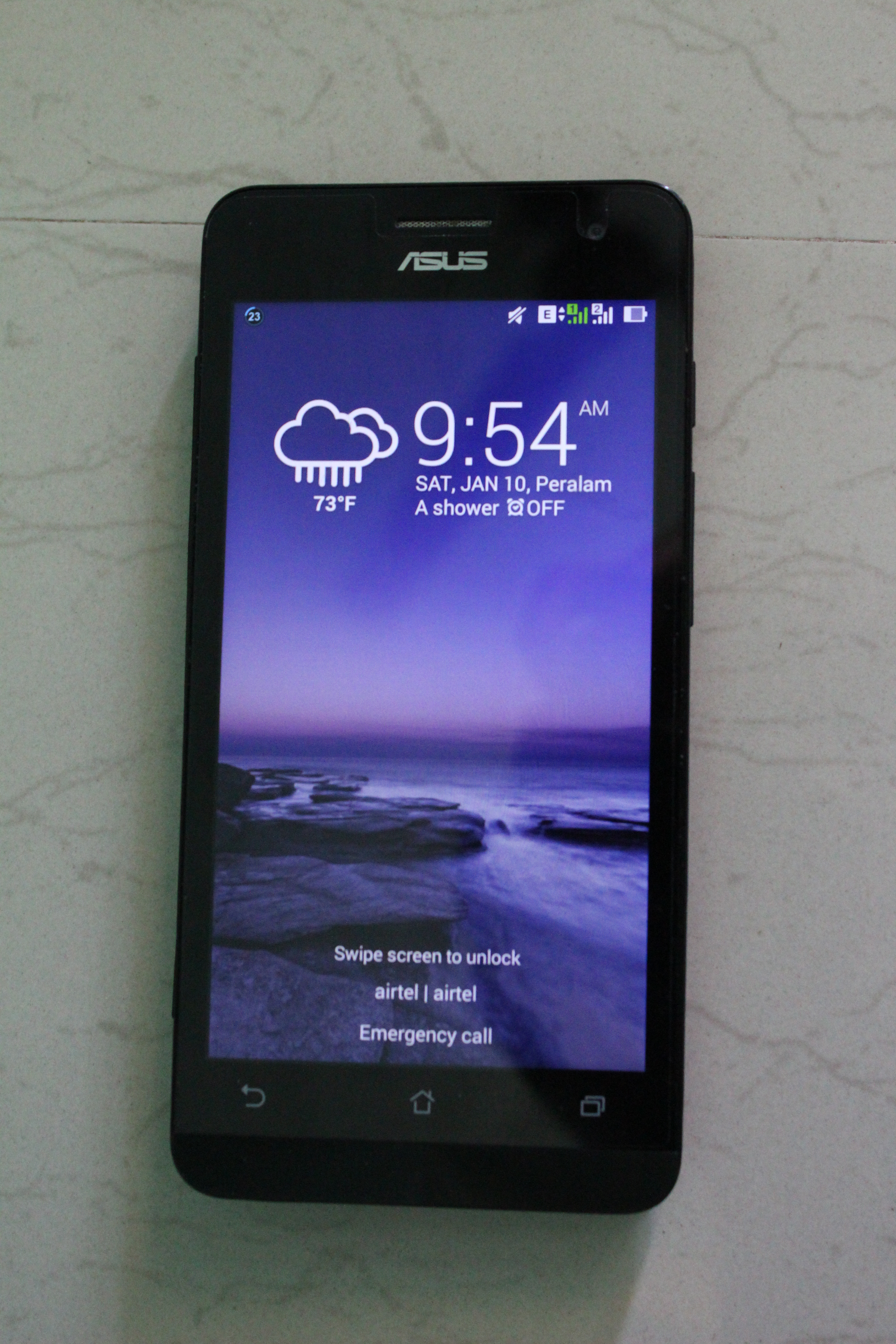
- Front view
- Brand: Asus
- Manufacturer: Asus
- Type: Smartphone
- Series: Asus ZenFone
- First released: A500CG: April 2014; A500KL: July 2014; A502CG (Lite): November 2014
- Discontinued: Yes
- Predecessor: Asus ZenFone 4
- Successor: Asus ZenFone 2
- Compatible networks: GSM, HSPA (A500CG / A502CG); GSM, HSPA, LTE (A500KL)
- Form factor: Slate
- Colors: Charcoal Black; Pearl White; Cherry Red; Champagne Gold (A500CG / A500KL); Twilight Purple (A500CG / A500KL)
- Dimensions: A500CG / A500KL: 148.2 × 72.8 × 10.3 mm; A502CG: 148.2 × 72.8 × 10.8 mm
- Weight: A500CG / A500KL: 145 g (5.1 oz); A502CG: 160 g (5.6 oz)
- Operating system: A500CG: Android 4.3 (Jelly Bean), upgradable to 5.0.2 (Lollipop); A500KL: Android 4.4.2 (KitKat), upgradable to 5.0.2 (Lollipop); A502CG: Android 4.4.2 (KitKat)
- System-on-chip: A500CG: Intel Atom Z2580; A500KL: Qualcomm MSM8926 Snapdragon 400; A502CG: Intel Atom Z2520
- CPU: A500CG: Dual-core 2.0 GHz; A500KL: Quad-core 1.2 GHz Cortex-A7; A502CG: Dual-core 1.2 GHz
- GPU: A500CG / A502CG: PowerVR SGX544MP2; A500KL: Adreno 305
- Memory: A500CG: 2 GB RAM; A500KL: 1 GB / 2 GB RAM; A502CG: 1 GB RAM
- Storage: A500CG / A500KL: 8 GB / 16 GB / 32 GB eMMC 4.5; A502CG: 8 GB eMMC 4.5
- Removable storage: microSDXC (dedicated slot)
- SIM: Dual SIM (Micro-SIM, dual stand-by) (A500KL is also available in Single Micro-SIM)
- Battery: A500CG / A500KL: Non-removable Li-Po 2110 mAh; A502CG: Non-removable Li-Po 2500 mAh
- Rear camera: A500CG / A500KL: 8 MP, f/2.0, AF, LED flash, panorama (1080p@30fps video); A502CG: 8 MP, AF, LED flash, panorama (720p@30fps video)
- Front camera: A500CG / A500KL: 2 MP, f/2.4; A502CG: VGA
- Display: A500CG / A500KL: 5.0 in (127 mm) IPS LCD 720 x 1280 pixels, 16:9 ratio (~294 ppi density) Corning Gorilla Glass 3; A502CG: 5.0 in (127 mm) IPS LCD 540 x 960 pixels, 16:9 ratio (~220 ppi density) Oleophobic coating
- Model: A500CG: T00J / T00J-D; A500KL: T00P; A502CG: T00K

The Asus Zenfone 5 (2014 series) consists of a family of Android smartphones designed, developed, and marketed by Asus as part of the first-generation Zenfone lineup.

Announced throughout 2014 at CES 2014, the series includes three primary variants: the original 3G model (A500CG), an LTE-capable version (A500KL), and a lower-cost alternative known as the Zenfone 5 Lite (A502CG).

The LTE version (A500KL) was released in Malaysia on June 3, 2014 and on November 17, 2014 in India for the A502CG version.

== Design ==
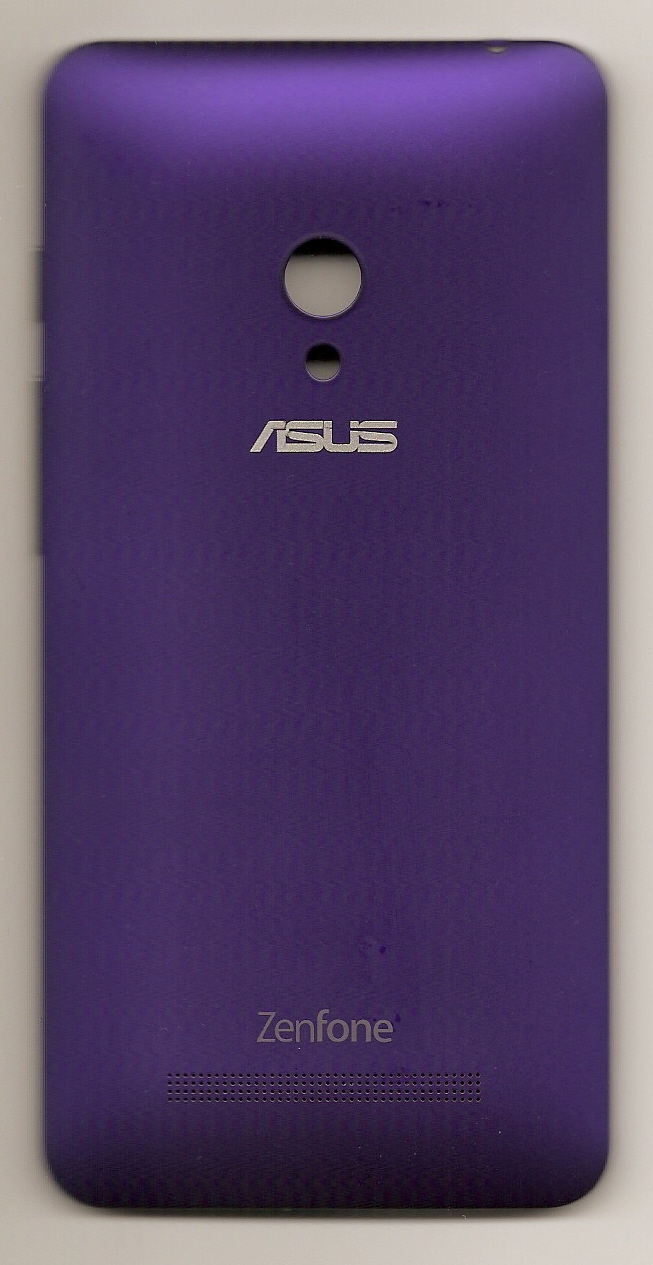
Rear view

The smartphones within this family feature a uniform physical footprint across their front profiles, utilizing a slate form factor with a noticeable chin piece that carries Asus's signature concentric-circle metallic texture. The original A500CG and LTE-enabled A500KL possess identical dimensions, measuring 148.2 mm in height, 72.8 mm in width, and 10.3 mm in thickness, with a total weight of 145 grams. By comparison, the Zenfone 5 Lite A502CG increases slightly in thickness to 10.8 mm and weighs 160 grams to accommodate changes in interior hardware. All models feature a plastic rear shell and plastic framing, and were sold in a variety of colors including Charcoal Black, Pearl White, and Cherry Red, while the high-tier models also offered Champagne Gold and Twilight Purple options.

== Technical specifications ==
=== Processors ===
Asus selected vastly different processing architectures depending on the specific model within the generation. The standard A500CG model is powered by an Intel Atom Z2580 chipset featuring a dual-core 2.0 GHz processor paired with a PowerVR SGX544MP2 graphics processing unit. The LTE-capable A500KL shifts away from Intel components entirely, opting for a Qualcomm MSM8926 Snapdragon 400 chipset built on a 28 nm process that utilizes a quad-core 1.2 GHz Cortex-A7 CPU and an Adreno 305 GPU. The Zenfone 5 Lite A502CG relies on a stepped-down Intel Atom Z2520 chipset, which clocks down to a dual-core speed of 1.2 GHz while retaining the same PowerVR SGX544MP2 graphics core.

=== Batteries ===
Both the A500CG and A500KL models share a smaller 2,110 mAh cell, yielding up to 18.5 hours and 20.6 hours of talk time over 3G networks respectively. Conversely, despite its budget status, the thicker Zenfone 5 Lite A502CG contains a larger 2,500 mAh battery capacity, providing an extended standby rating of up to 424 hours on 3G connectivity.

=== Memory ===
The flagship A500CG variant features 2 GB of RAM and was manufactured in flash storage configurations of 8 GB, 16 GB, or 32 GB. The A500KL LTE model features internal storage options mirroring the A500CG but varies its RAM allocation, offering either 1 GB or 2 GB options based on regional sales parameters. The budget Lite A502CG includes a reduced system memory ceiling of 1 GB RAM accompanied by a standard 8 GB of storage space. All three units support expansion up to 64 GB via a dedicated microSDXC card slot.

=== Display ===
All models in the lineup utilize a 5.0-inch IPS LCD panel that outputs a widescreen 16:9 aspect ratio, achieving an approximate 63.9% screen-to-body ratio. The premium A500CG and A500KL panels yield a High Definition (HD) resolution of 720 × 1280 pixels, which equates to a pixel density of roughly 294 pixels per inch, and are structurally defended by Corning Gorilla Glass 3 layer protection. To reduce component costs, the Zenfone 5 Lite A502CG downgrades its resolution to a lower qHD matrix of 540 × 960 pixels at a density of roughly 220 pixels per inch, dropping the scratch-resistant Gorilla Glass for standard protective coating.

=== Cameras ===
==== Rear ====
The entire device generation shares an identical 8-megapixel rear-facing primary camera module that features an f/2.0 aperture value, autofocus capabilities, a single LED flash, and panoramic shooting capabilities. The maximum video recording capabilities vary significantly across the choices of internal silicon architectures.

The Intel-based A500CG and Qualcomm-based A500KL models can successfully record 1080p Full HD video at a smooth rate of 30 frames per second, whereas the weaker Intel processing architecture in the Zenfone 5 Lite limits video captures to a 720p HD maximum standard.

==== Front ====
The A500CG and A500KL phones are equipped with a 2-megapixel sensor containing an f/2.4 aperture, while the Lite model shifts down to a lower-fidelity VGA resolution lens.

=== Software ===
The initial A500CG model shipped with Android 4.3 Jelly Bean pre-installed, though Asus subsequently pushed official firmware upgrades lifting the core architecture to Android 5.0.2 Lollipop. Both the A500KL and the A502CG Lite versions shipped with a more modern Android 4.4.2 KitKat base operating system, though only the A500KL retained the pipeline path to receive an official upgrade to Android 5.0.2 Lollipop. All units incorporate Asus’s proprietary ZenUI overlay launcher, introducing specialized custom widgets, native system apps, and visual layout redesigns layered over the standard Android user interface.
