= ROG Phone 8 =

Gaming Smartphone line manufactured by ASUS released in 2024

ROG Phone 8 ROG Phone 8 Pro ROG Phone 8 Pro Edition
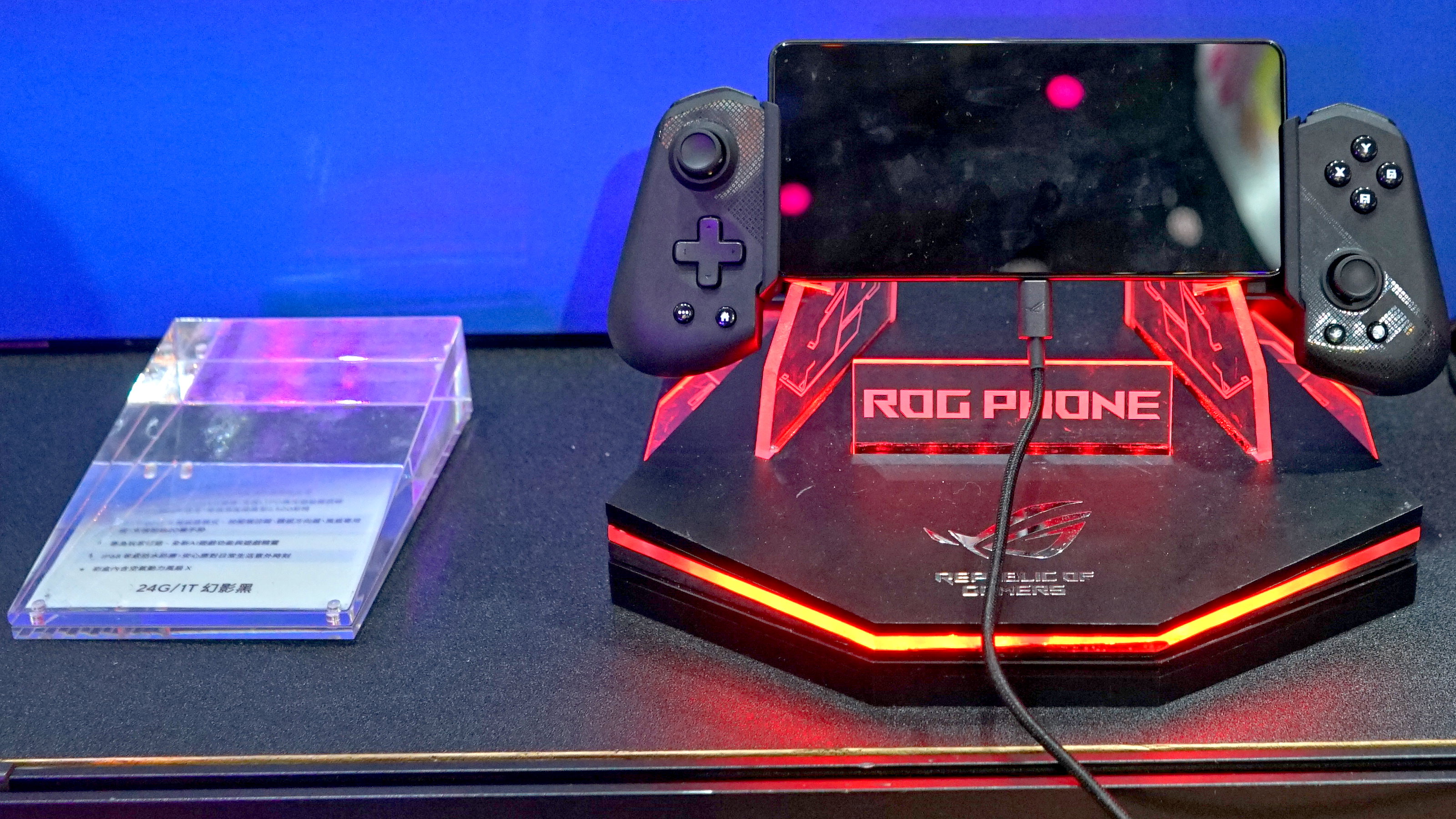
- The ROG Phone 8 Pro Edition with connected ROG Tessen Mobile Controller
- Brand: Asus ROG
- Manufacturer: Asus
- Type: Gaming smartphone
- Series: Asus ROG
- First released: January 18, 2024; 2 years ago
- Predecessor: ROG Phone 7
- Successor: ROG Phone 9
- Related: Asus ZenFone 11 Ultra
- Compatible networks: GSM / CDMA / HSPA / LTE / 5G
- Form factor: Slate
- Colors: Phantom Black (ROG Phone 8 Pro Edition, 8 Pro and 8), Rebel Grey (ROG Phone 8 Pro and 8)
- Dimensions: 163.8 mm (6.45 in) H 76.8 mm (3.02 in) W 8.9 mm (0.35 in) D
- Weight: 225 g (7.9 oz)
- Operating system: Android 14
- System-on-chip: Qualcomm Snapdragon 8 Gen 3 (4 nm)
- CPU: Octa-core (1x3.3 GHz Cortex-X4 & 5x3.2 GHz Cortex-A720 & 2x2.3 GHz Cortex-A520)
- GPU: Adreno 750
- Memory: 24 GB RAM; 16 GB RAM; 12 GB RAM
- Storage: 1 TB; 512 GB; 256 GB
- Removable storage: None
- SIM: Dual SIM (Nano-SIM, dual stand-by)
- Battery: Li-Po 5500 mAh
- Charging: Fast charging 65W, 15W Wireless charging, 10W Reverse wired charging
- Rear camera: 50 MP, f/1.9, (wide), 1/1.56", 1.0µm, PDAF, gimbal OIS; 32 MP, f/2.4, (telephoto), 1/3.2", 0.7µm, PDAF, OIS, 3x optical zoom; 13 MP, f/2.2, 13mm, 120˚ (ultrawide); LED flash, HDR, panorama; 8K@24fps, 4K@30/60fps, 1080p@30/60/120/240fps, 720p@480fps; gyro-EIS, HDR10+
- Front camera: 32 MP, f/2.5, 22mm (wide), 1/3.2", 0.7µm; Panorama, HDR; 1080p@30fps
- Display: 6.78 in (172 mm); 1080 x 2400 px resolution (~388 ppi density); LTPO AMOLED, 1B colors, 165Hz, HDR10, 1600 nits (HBM), 2500 nits (peak); Corning Gorilla Glass Victus 2
- Sound: Stereo speakers; 3.5mm headphone jack
- Connectivity: Wi-Fi 802.11 a/b/g/n/ac/6e/7, tri-band, Wi-Fi Direct; Bluetooth 5.3, A2DP, LE, aptX HD, aptX Adaptive, aptX Lossless
- Data inputs: Multi-touch screen; USB Type-C 3.2; Fingerprint scanner (under display, optical); Accelerometer; Gyroscope; Proximity sensor; Compass
- Water resistance: IP68 water and dust resistant
- Website: rog.asus.com/phones/rog-phone-8/; rog.asus.com/phones/rog-phone-8-pro/

The ROG Phone 8 is a line of Android gaming smartphones made by Asus as the seventh generation of ROG smartphone series following the sixth generation ROG Phone 7. It was launched on 18 January 2024.

== Models ==
With the line, Asus moved away from their usual design language focused on gaming. The ROG phone 8 line was released with a design more reminiscent of other flagships with reduced bezels and a hole-punch style camera. Due to the smaller size, the battery was reduced to 5500 mAh from the 6000 mAh found in previous models. Additionally the ultra-sonic shoulder buttons were replaced with pressure sensitive buttons that require more activating pressure.

The lineup includes three models. The base version of the ROG Phone 8 comes with 12 or 16 GB of LPDDR5X RAM, 256 GB of UFS 4.0 storage, and costs €1099.99/USD1099.99.

The Pro variant model of the ROG Phone 8 comes with 16 GB of LPDDR5X RAM and 512 GB UFS 4.0 storage which costs €1199.99/USD1199.99

The ROG Phone 8 Pro edition is the most expensive model of the series, and has specifications that are locked at 24 GB of LPDDR5X RAM and 1 TB of UFS 4.0 storage costing €1499.99/USD1,499.99

The visual design differences between the ROG Phone 8, ROG Phone 8 Pro and ROG Phone 8 Pro Edition are focused on the rear of the phone case. The ROG Phone 8 and 8 pro contains an RGB LED symbol of the Republic of Gamers logo that the user can customize to their desired colors, static or dynamic. The logo can also perform custom light show displays based on phone events, such as when the phone is charging, or receiving a phone call.

The ROG Phone 8 Pro Edition variant instead has a LED matrix display on the rear of the phone composed of 341 individually lit mini LEDs that can be configured to display pre-created animations, such as when receiving a phone call, a virtual battery when the phone is charging, countdown for pictures and allows for the display of custom GIFs.

=== AeroActive Cooler X ===
The AeroActive Cooler X is a USB-C powered external fan accessory designed for the ROG Phone 8. The accessory features a thermally conductive pad, a copper plate, a peltier element, cooling fins, a centrifugal fan, and an "AI Controlled" humidity sensor. The AeroActive Cooler 8 has an MSRP of €99.99.

The accessory connects into the USB-C port located on the bottom horizontal bezel, and the user then snaps down the top spring-loaded clip onto the phones top horizontal bezel, covering over the power button. Despite the AeroActive Cooler X covering the horizontal USB-C port and the power button, the accessory has a rubber button at the top of the spring loaded clip that still allows the user to power the phone on and off while the accessory is attached. Additionally, the accessory has a USB-C port passthrough so the user can still charge the phone with the horizontal USB-C port while the AeroActive Cooler X is attached. The accessory also features a plastic kickstand to allow the user to prop their phone up horizontally while on a flat surface. The kickstand is not adjustable.

The accessory also features two customizable AirTrigger buttons that allow the user to grip the phone with both hands on the vertical bezels and place their fingers behind the phone and push the trigger-style buttons to perform user defined functions in games. Included with the AeroActive Cooler X accessory is a bumper-style phone case that allows the user to utilize the accessory while protecting the edges of the phone from minor impact damage.

The AeroActive Cooler X has customizable RGB lighting zones and features four software controlled cooling configurations; Smart, Cool, Frosty, and Frozen.

- The Smart setting monitors thermals and engages the fan and the peltier element depending on the temperature of the phone.
- The Cool setting only engages the fan to air cool the phone and not the peltier element, using around 0.7~0.8 watts.
- The Frosty setting engages both the air cooling fan and the peltier element, using around 4 watts.
- The Frozen setting engages both the air cooling fan and the peltier element, but requires the user to plug in an external USB-C powered cable to the accessory. This setting uses 7 watts.

=== ROG Phone 8 Glass Screen Protector ===
ASUS introduced an antibacterial tempered glass screen protector, the screen protector claims a hardness of 9H and 2.5D full coverage of the phone's display. The screen protector has darkened edges that lay on top of the phone's bezels.
