= ROG Phone 6 =

Android-based smartphones manufactured by Asus

ROG Phone 6 ROG Phone 6 Pro
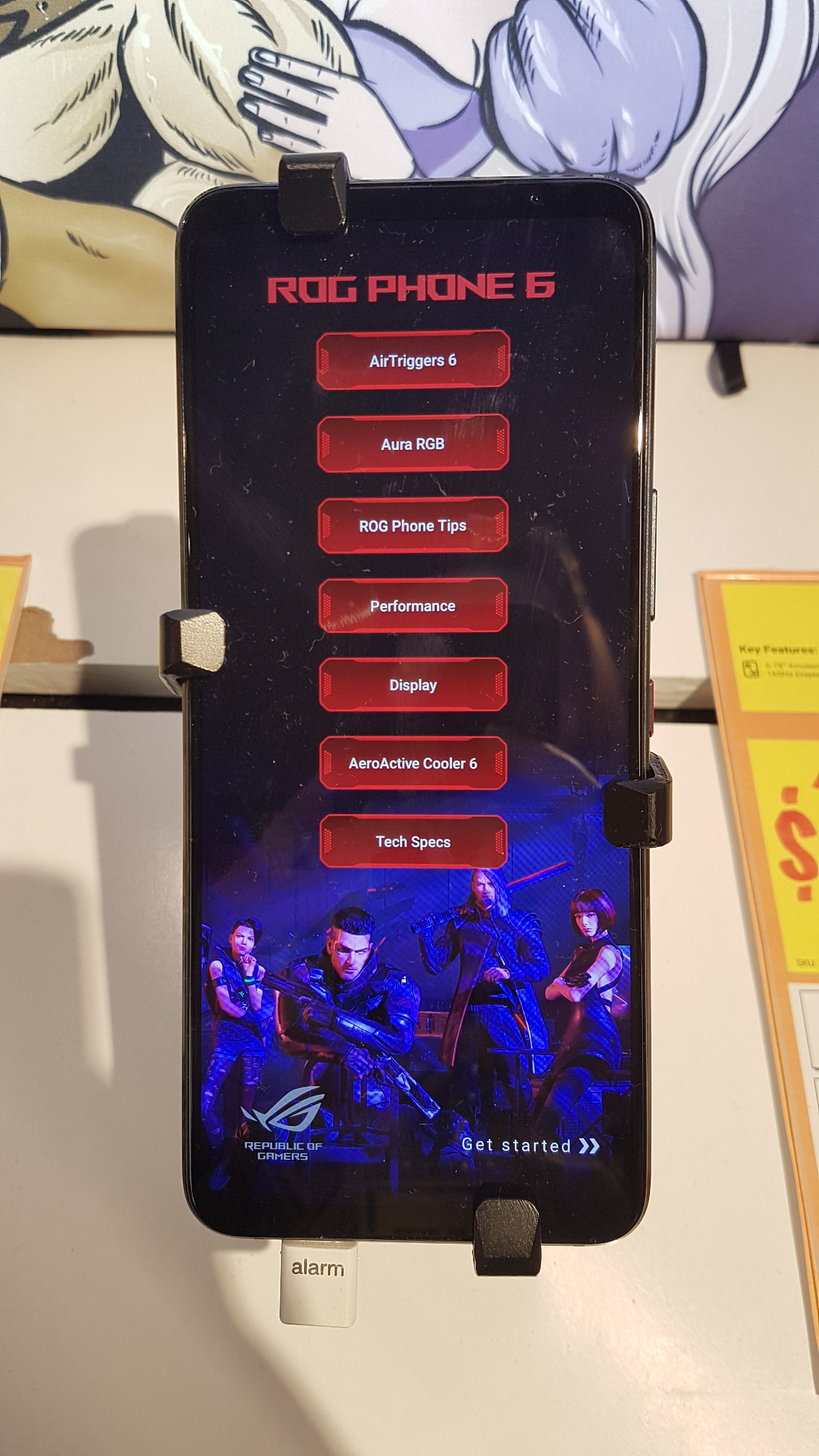
- The front of the ROG Phone 6
- Brand: ROG
- Manufacturer: Asus
- Type: Smartphone
- Series: Asus ROG
- First released: July 13, 2022; 3 years ago
- Predecessor: ROG Phone 5
- Successor: ROG Phone 7
- Compatible networks: GSM / CDMA / HSPA / LTE / 5G
- Form factor: Slate
- Colors: Phantom Black, Storm White
- Dimensions: 173 mm (6.8 in) H 77 mm (3.0 in) W 10.3 mm (0.41 in) D
- Weight: 239 g (8.4 oz)
- Operating system: Android 12
- System-on-chip: Qualcomm Snapdragon 8+ Gen 1 (4 nm)
- CPU: Octa-core (1x3.19 GHz Cortex-X2 & 3x2.75 GHz Cortex-A710 & 4x1.80 GHz Cortex-A510)
- GPU: Adreno 730
- Memory: ROG Phone 6: 8, 12 or 16 GB LPDDR5 RAM; ROG Phone 6 Pro: 18 GB LPDDR5 RAM
- Storage: ROG Phone 6: 128, 256 or 512 GB; ROG Phone 6 Pro: 512 GB; All: UFS 3.1
- SIM: Dual SIM (Nano-SIM, dual stand-by)
- Battery: 6000 mAh
- Charging: Fast charging 65W
- Rear camera: 50 MP, f/1.9, (wide), 1/1.56", 1.0µm, PDAF; 13 MP, f/2.2, (ultrawide); 5 MP, (macro); LED flash, HDR, panorama; 8K@24fps, 4K@30/60/120fps, 1080p@30/60/120/240fps, 720p@480fps; gyro-EIS
- Front camera: 12 MP, 28mm (wide)
- Display: 6.78 in (172 mm); 1080 × 2448 px resolution (~395 ppi density); AMOLED, 1B colors, 165Hz refresh rate, HDR10+, 800 nits (typ), 1200 nits (peak); Corning Gorilla Glass Victus
- Sound: Stereo speakers
- Connectivity: Wi-Fi 802.11 a/b/g/n/ac/6e, tri-band, Wi-Fi Direct, hotspot Bluetooth 5.2, A2DP, LE, aptX HD, aptX Adaptive
- Data inputs: Multi-touch screen; USB Type-C 3.1; Fingerprint scanner (under display, optical); Accelerometer; Gyroscope; Proximity sensor; Compass
- Water resistance: IPX4
- Website: rog.asus.com/phones/rog-phone-6-model/

ROG Phone 6 is a line of Android gaming smartphones made by Asus as the fifth generation of ROG smartphone series following the fourth generation ROG Phone 5. It was launched on July 5, 2022.

== Models ==
The lineup includes three models. The Chinese base version of the ROG Phone 6 comes with 8 GBs of LPDDR5 RAM, 128 GBs of UFS 3.1 storage, and costs ¥107,600/£650/€750. This model does not appear to be available for the Global variants of these phones. The Global variant base model of the ROG Phone 6 comes with 12 GBs of LPDDR5 RAM and 256 GBs UFS 3.1 storage which costs £899/€999. The Chinese and Global variants have the maximum specifications of 16 GBs of LPDDR5 RAM and 512 GBs of UFS 3.1 storage for £999/€1,149. The ROG Phone 6 Pro is the most expensive model of the series, and has specifications that are locked at 18 GBs of LPDDR5 RAM and 512 GBs of UFS 3.1 storage costing £1,099/€1,299.

The visual design differences between the ROG Phone 6 and the ROG Phone 6 Pro are focused on the rear of the phone case. The ROG Phone 6 contains a vertical RGB LED symbol of the Republic of Gamers logo that the user can customize to their desired colors, static or dynamic. The logo can also perform custom light show displays based on phone events, such as when the phone is charging, or receiving a phone call. The ROG Phone 6 Pro variant instead has a 2" wide OLED display on the rear of the phone that can be configured to display pre-created animations, such as when receiving a phone call, a virtual battery when the phone is charging, or when the phone detects that the user has switched it to a overclocked setting (X-Mode).

== ROG Phone 6D ==
ASUS is also releasing an additional two ROG Phone 6 variants that were revealed on September 19, 2022, known as the ROG Phone 6D and the ROG Phone 6D Ultimate. These phones will contain the same hardware specifications as the previously mentioned ROG Phone 6 models, with the exception of the processor being the MediaTek Dimensity 9000+ (4 nm) chip instead of the Qualcomm Snapdragon 8+ Gen 1 (4 nm).

The ROG Phone 6D Ultimate has a moving vent flap on the rear of the phone that opens to reveal internal heat dissipation fins. ASUS totes this feature as "a new advanced cooling system that allows airflow unlike any ROG Phone before." Early reviews speculate that this vent flap may work in tandem with the Areoactive Cooler 6 attachment meant to be utilized during heavy gaming sessions.

== ROG Phone 6 (Batman Edition) ==
A render of the ROG Phone 6 with Batman inspired themes and skins was leaked and shared by GSMArena on September 9, 2022. From the leaked image, the phone is black aside from some purple/lavender colors and symbols. It will likely share specifications similar to the ROG Phone 6.

== Accessories ==
The ROG Phone 6 is compatible with a number of ASUS manufactured accessories.

=== AeroActive Cooler 6 ===
The AeroActive Cooler 6 is a USB-C powered external fan accessory designed for the ROG Phone 6. The accessory features a thermally conductive pad, a copper plate, a peltier element, cooling fins, a centrifugal fan, and an "AI Controlled" humidity sensor. The AeroActive Cooler 6 has an MSRP of £79/€90.

The accessory connects into the USB-C port located on the bottom horizontal bezel, and the user then snaps down the top spring-loaded clip onto the phones top horizontal bezel, covering over the power button. Despite the AeroActive Cooler 6 covering the horizontal USB-C port and the power button, the accessory has a rubber button at the top of the spring loaded clip that still allows the user to power the phone on and off while the accessory is attached. Additionally, the accessory has a USB-C port passthrough so the user can still charge the phone with the horizontal USB-C port while the AeroActive Cooler 6 is attached. The accessory also features a plastic kickstand to allow the user to prop their phone up horizontally while on a flat surface. The kickstand is not adjustable.

The accessory also features four customizable AirTrigger buttons that allow the user to grip the phone with both hands on the vertical bezels and place their fingers behind the phone and push the trigger-style buttons to perform user defined functions in games. Included with the AeroActive Cooler 6 accessory is a bumper-style phone case that allows the user to utilize the accessory while protecting the edges of the phone from minor impact damage.

The AeroActive Cooler 6 has customizable RGB lighting zones and features four software controlled cooling configurations; Smart, Cool, Frosty, and Frozen.

- The Smart setting monitors thermals and engages the fan and the peltier element depending on the temperature of the phone.
- The Cool setting only engages the fan to air cool the phone and not the peltier element, using around 0.7~0.8 watts.
- The Frosty setting engages both the air cooling fan and the peltier element, using around 4 watts.
- The Frozen setting engages both the air cooling fan and the peltier element, but requires the user to plug in an external USB-C powered cable to the accessory. This setting uses 7 watts.

User comments about the AeroActive Cooler 6 note that the cooler is loud and that the transparent plastic on the accessory scratches easily.
