= Heat transfer through fins =

Fins are extensions on exterior surfaces of objects that increase the rate of heat transfer to or from the object by increasing convection. This is achieved by increasing the surface area of the body, which in turn increases the heat transfer rate by a sufficient degree. This is an efficient way of increasing the rate, since the alternative way of doing so is by increasing either the heat transfer coefficient (which depends on the nature of materials being used and the conditions of use) or the temperature gradient (which depends on the conditions of use). Clearly, changing the shape of the bodies is more convenient. Fins are therefore a very popular solution to increase the heat transfer from surfaces and are widely used in a number of objects. The fin material should preferably have high thermal conductivity. In most applications the fin is surrounded by a fluid in motion, which heats or cools it quickly due to the large surface area, and subsequently the heat gets transferred to or from the body quickly due to the high thermal conductivity of the fin. In order to design a fin for optimal heat transfer performance with minimal cost, the dimensions and shape of the fin have to be calculated for specific applications. A common way of doing so is by creating a model of the fin and then simulating it under required service conditions.

== Modeling ==
Consider a body with fins on its outer surface, with air flowing around it.

The heat transfer rate depends on

- Shape and geometry of the external surface
- Surface area of the body
- Velocity of the wind (or any fluid in other cases)
- Temperature of surroundings

Modelling of the fins in this case involves, experimenting on this physical model and optimizing the number of fins and fin pitch for maximum performance.

One of the experimentally obtained equations for heat transfer coefficient for the fin surface for low wind velocities is:

$$k=2.11  v^{0.71}  \theta^{0.44}   a^{-0.14}$$

where

k= Fin surface heat transfer coefficient [W/m^{2}K ]

a=fin length [mm]

v=wind velocity [km/h]

θ=fin pitch [mm]

Another equation for high fluid velocities, obtained from experiments conducted by Gibson, is

$$k= 241.7[0.0247-0.00148(a^{0.8}/\theta^{0.4})] v^{0.73}$$

where

k=Fin surface heat transfer coefficient[W/m^{2}K ]

a=Fin length[mm]

θ=Fin pitch[mm]

v=Wind velocity[km/h]

A more accurate equation for fin surface heat transfer coefficient is:

$$k_{avg} = (2.47-2.55/\theta^{0.4}) v^{0.9} 0.0872 \theta + 4.31$$

where

k (avg)= Fin surface heat transfer coefficient[W/m^{2}K ]

θ=Fin pitch[mm]

v=Wind velocity[km/h]

All these equations can be used to evaluate average heat transfer coefficient for various fin designs.

== Design ==
The momentum conservation equation for this case is given as follows:

$${\partial(\rho v)\over\partial t} + v \nabla . (\rho v) = -\nabla P + \nabla . \tau + F + \rho g$$

This is used in combination with the continuity equation.

The energy equation is also needed, which is:

$${\partial (\rho E)\over\partial t} + \nabla.[v(\rho E + p)] =\nabla.[k_{eff}\nabla T- \Sigma_j h_j J_j +(\tau.v)]$$.

The above equation, on solving, gives the temperature profile for the fluid region.

When solved as a scalar equation, it can be used to calculate the temperatures at the fin and cylinder surfaces, by reducing to:

$$\nabla^2 T + {\overset{.}{q}\over k} = {1 \over \alpha} {\partial T\over\partial t}$$

Where:

q = internal heat generation = 0 (in this case).

Also dT/dt = 0 due to steady state assumption.

These flow and energy equations can be set up and solved in any simulation software, e.g. Fluent. In order to do so, all parameters of flow and thermal conditions like fluid velocity and temperature of body have to be specified according to the requirement. Also, the boundary conditions and assumptions if any must be specified.

This results in velocity profiles and temperature profiles for various surfaces and this knowledge can be used to design the fin.
