= ROG Phone 7 =

Android-based smartphones manufactured by Asus

ROG Phone 7 ROG Phone 7 Ultimate
- Brand: Asus ROG
- Manufacturer: Asus
- Type: Gaming smartphone
- Series: Asus ROG
- First released: April 13, 2023; 3 years ago
- Predecessor: ROG Phone 6
- Successor: ROG Phone 8
- Compatible networks: GSM / CDMA / HSPA / LTE / 5G
- Form factor: Slate
- Colors: Phantom Black (only ROG Phone 7), Storm White
- Dimensions: 173 mm (6.8 in) H 77 mm (3.0 in) W 10.3 mm (0.41 in) D
- Weight: 239 g (8.4 oz)
- Operating system: Android 13
- System-on-chip: Qualcomm Snapdragon 8 Gen 2 (4 nm)
- CPU: Octa-core (1x3.2 GHz Cortex-X3 & 2x2.8 GHz Cortex-A715 & 2x2.8 GHz Cortex-A710 & 3x2.0 GHz Cortex-A510)
- GPU: Adreno 740
- Memory: 16 GB RAM
- Storage: 512 GB
- Removable storage: None
- SIM: Dual SIM (Nano-SIM, dual stand-by)
- Battery: Li-Po 6000 mAh
- Charging: Fast charging 65W
- Rear camera: 50 MP, f/1.9, (wide), 1/1.56", 1.0µm, PDAF; 13 MP, f/2.2, 120˚ (ultrawide); 8 MP, f/2.0, (macro); LED flash, HDR, panorama; 8K@24fps, 4K@30/60fps, 1080p@30/60/120/240fps, 720p@480fps; gyro-EIS, HDR10+
- Front camera: 32 MP, f/2.5, (wide), 1/3.2", 0.7µm; Panorama, HDR; 1080p@30fps
- Display: 6.78 in (172 mm); 1080 x 2448 px resolution (~395 ppi density); AMOLED, 1B colors, 165Hz, HDR10+, 1000 nits (HBM), 1500 nits (peak); Corning Gorilla Glass Victus
- Sound: Stereo speakers; 3.5mm headphone jack
- Connectivity: Wi-Fi 802.11 a/b/g/n/ac/6e/7, tri-band, Wi-Fi Direct; Bluetooth 5.2, A2DP, LE, aptX HD, aptX Adaptive
- Data inputs: Multi-touch screen; USB Type-C 3.1; Fingerprint scanner (under display, optical); Accelerometer; Gyroscope; Proximity sensor; Compass
- Water resistance: IP54 water resistant
- Website: rog.asus.com/phones/rog-phone-7/; rog.asus.com/phones/rog-phone-7-ultimate/

The ROG Phone 7 and ROG Phone 7 Ultimate are Android gaming smartphones made by Asus as the sixth generation of ROG smartphone series following the fifth generation ROG Phone 6. They were launched on April 13, 2023.
