= ROG Phone 5 =

Android-based smartphones manufactured by Asus

Asus ROG Phone 5 Asus ROG Phone 5 Pro Asus ROG Phone 5 Ultimate
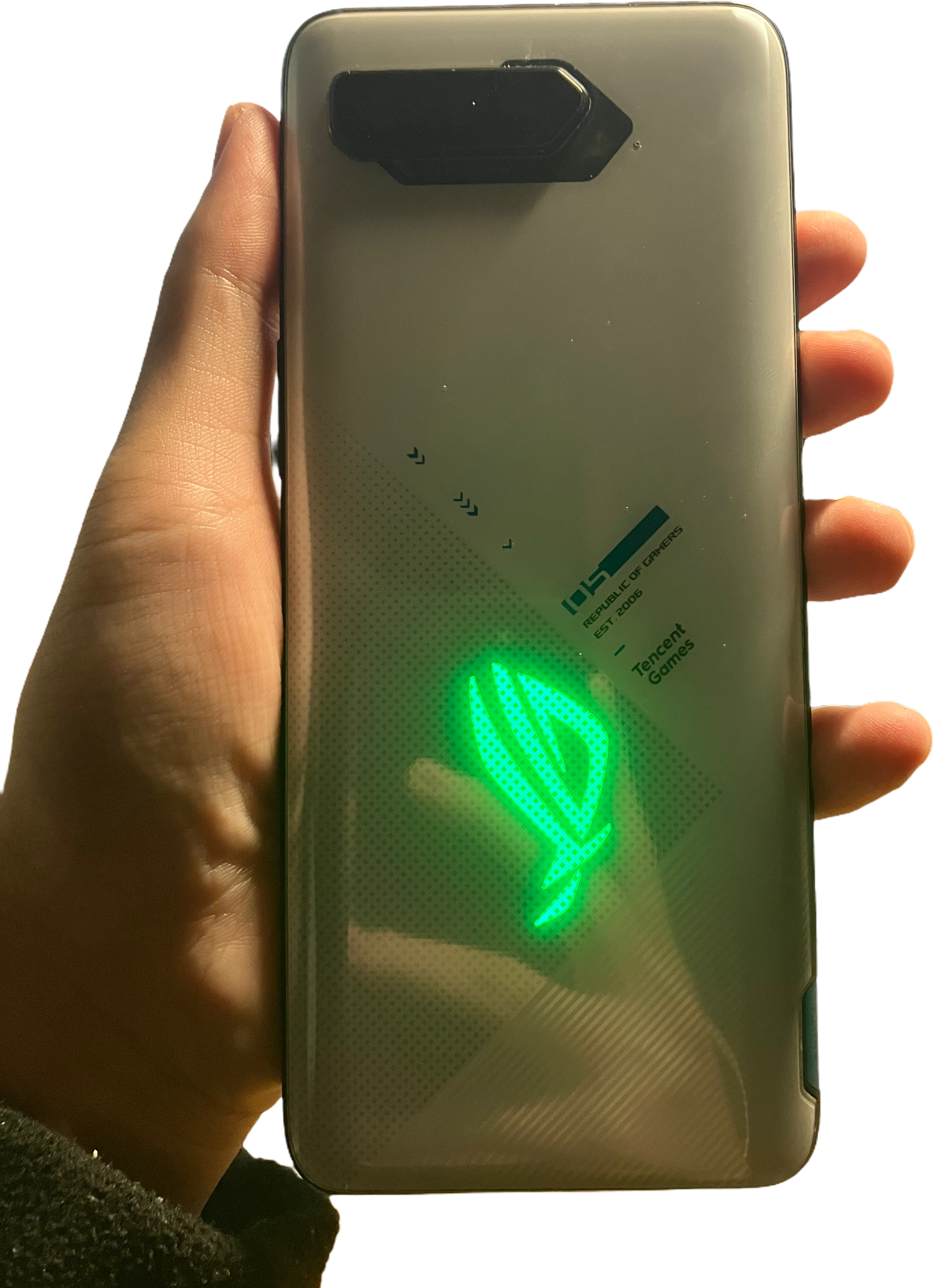
- The back of the ROG Phone 5
- Brand: Asus ROG
- Manufacturer: Asus
- Type: Phablet
- Predecessor: ROG Phone 3
- Successor: ROG Phone 6
- Compatible networks: 2G, 3G, 4G, 4G LTE and 5G
- Form factor: Slate
- Dimensions: 172.8 mm × 77.3 mm × 10.3 mm (6.80 in × 3.04 in × 0.41 in)
- Weight: 238 g (8.4 oz)
- Operating system: ROG UI based on Android 11
- System-on-chip: Qualcomm Snapdragon 888
- CPU: Octa-core (1x 2.84 GHz Kryo 680 Prime + 3x 2.42 GHz Kryo 680 Gold + 4x 1.8 GHz Kryo 680 Silver)
- GPU: Adreno 660
- Memory: LPDDR5 RAM; 8/12 GB (Base); 16 GB (Pro); 18 GB (Ultimate)
- Storage: UFS 3.1; 128/256 GB (Base); 256 GB (Pro); 512 GB (Ultimate)
- Removable storage: None
- Battery: 6000 mAh Li-Po (2x 3000 mAh)
- Charging: 65 W Fast charging, Reverse charging 10 W Power Delivery 3.0 Quick Charge 5
- Rear camera: 64 MP Sony Exmor IMX686, f/1.8, 26mm (wide), 1/1.73", 0.8 μm, PDAF + 13 MP, f/2.4, 125˚, 11mm (ultrawide) + 5 MP, f/2.0, (macro); LED flash, HDR, panorama, 8K@30fps, 4K@30fps, 1080p@30fps
- Front camera: 24 MP, f/2.5, 27mm (wide), 0.9 μm
- Display: 6.78 in (172 mm) AMOLED capacitive touchscreen, 1080p 1080 × 2448 pixels, 20.4:9 aspect ratio (395 ppi), 144 Hz refresh rate, HDR10+
- External display: ROG Vision PMOLED (Pro & Ultimate)
- Connectivity: Bluetooth 5.2, HFP, AVRCP, HID, PAN, OPP, A2DP, LE, aptX HD, aptX Adaptive; WiFi 6E 802.11a/b/g/n/ac/ax 2x2 MIMO (2.4, 5 & 6 GHz), dual-band, WiFi Direct, hotspot, NFC
- Data inputs: Sensors: Fingerprint scanner (optical); Accelerometer; Gyroscope; Proximity sensor Hall-effect sensor Magnetometer
- Website: Base and Pro: https://rog.asus.com/phones/rog-phone-5-model/ Ultimate: https://rog.asus.com/phones/rog-phone-5-ultimate-model/

ROG Phone 5 is a line of Android gaming smartphones made by Asus as the fourth generation of ROG smartphone series following the third generation ROG Phone 3 (and skipping the number four as the number four is considered unlucky in many East Asian cultures). It was launched on 10 March 2021.

== Models ==
The lineup includes three models— the ROG Phone 5 is the base model which costs €799. The ROG Phone 5 Pro is a slightly higher-end model with similar specifications, and the ROG Phone 5 Ultimate is their highest-end and most expensive model at €1299.

== ROG Phone 5s ==
Asus announced the ROG Phone 5s and 5s Pro in August 2021 as hardware revisions. Both phones have the Snapdragon 888+ chipset, as well as a faster touch sampling rate of 360 Hz compared to 300 Hz on the ROG Phone 5.
