= ROG Phone 9 =

Eighth-generation gaming smartphone

ROG Phone 9 Series
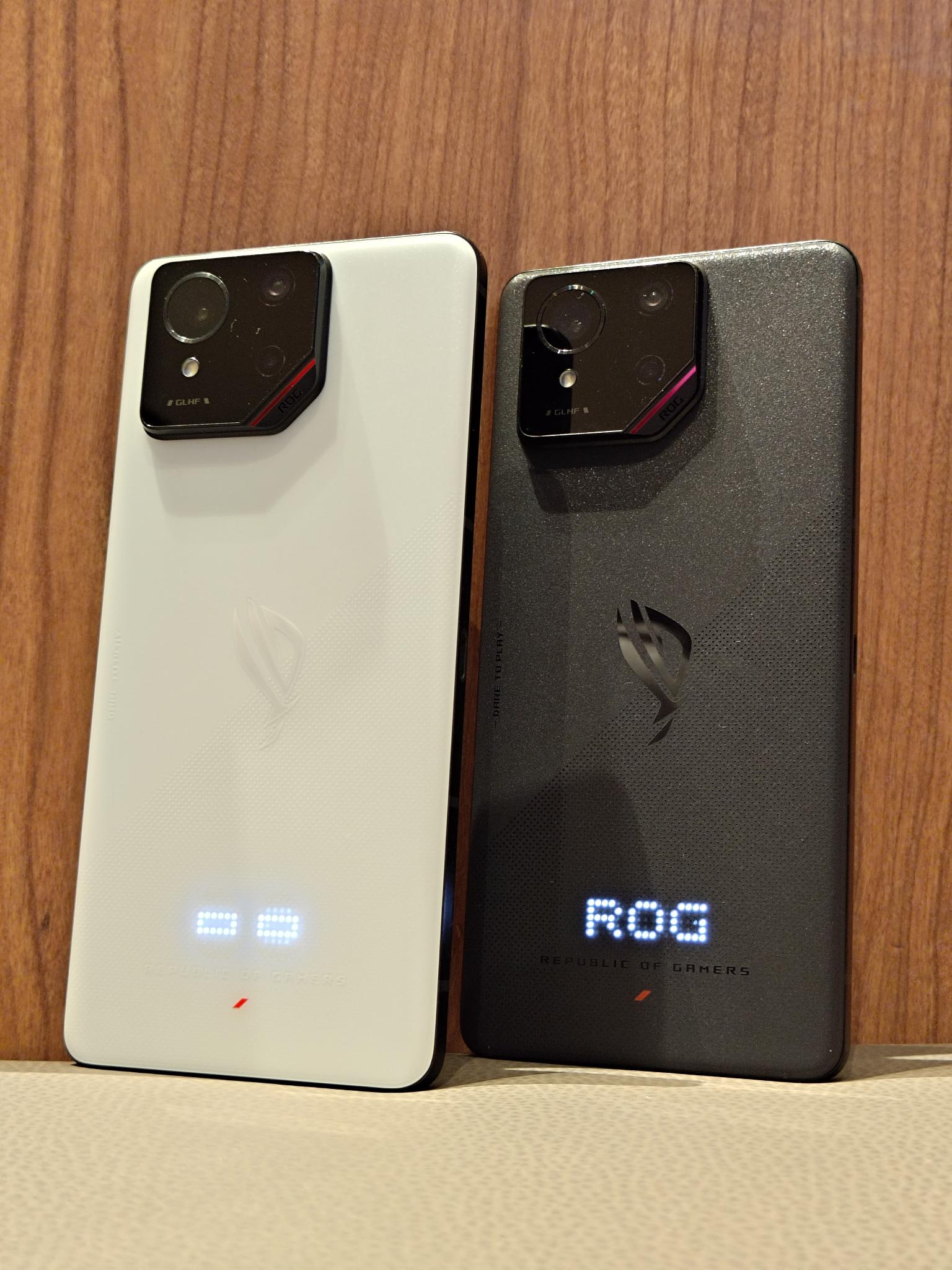
- Manufacturer: ASUS Republic of Gamers (ROG)
- Type: Smartphone
- First released: November 19, 2024
- Predecessor: ROG Phone 8 Series
- Related: Asus Zenfone 12 Ultra
- Dimensions: 163.8×77×8.9 mm (6.45×3.03×0.35 in)
- Weight: 227 g (8 oz); 225g (9 FE)
- Operating system: Android 15
- Memory: 12GB or 16GB LPDDR5X; 16GB LPDDR5X (9 FE and 9 Pro); 24GB LPDDR5X (9 Pro Edition)
- Storage: 256GB, 512GB or 1TB UFS 4.0
- Battery: 5800mAh; 5500mAh (9 FE)
- Display: 6.78" FHD+ (2400x1080 pixels) 185Hz SAMSUNG Flexible AMOLED
- Website: https://rog.asus.com/phones/rog-phone-9/ https://rog.asus.com/phones/rog-phone-9-pro/ https://rog.asus.com/my/phones/rog-phone-9-fe/
- References: https://www.gsmarena.com/asus_rog_phone_9-13503.php

The ROG Phone 9 series is a gaming-focused smartphone series designed and marketed under the ASUS Republic of Gamers (ROG) brand. These devices represent the eighth iteration of the ROG Phone series. The ROG Phone 9 was officially unveiled globally on November 19, 2024, with availability subsequently expanding to various regions, including a United States launch in January 2025.

== History ==
ROG launched the ROG Phone 9 series as the eighth generation of its gaming-focused smartphone lineup, following the ROG Phone 8 series introduced earlier that same year. The ROG Phone 9 lineup includes two models: the standard ROG Phone 9, the ROG Phone 9 Pro, and the ROG Phone 9 Pro Edition. Each model targets different performance tiers, with the Pro Edition offering the highest specs and bundled accessories. This multi-tiered strategy is intended to provide scalable options to cater to both casual and hardcore mobile gamers.

== Design ==
The ROG Phone 9 series features an AMOLED display with minimal bezels and a chassis that includes IP68 water resistance and retains the 3.5mm headphone jack. Both the ROG Phone 9 and 9 Pro have a matte protective glass back with a nano-crystalline texture, which resists fingerprints.

A standout design element is the rear AniMe Vision LED panel — the standard phone sports an 85-mini-LED array for animations, while the Pro version's 648-mini-LED supports interactive "arcade" mini-games and notifications.

== Display ==
The ROG Phone 9 series has a 6.78‑inch FHD+ (2400×1080) Samsung Flexible AMOLED panel featuring LTPO technology. The display offers a dynamic refresh rate from 1Hz to 120Hz in regular use and can ramp up to 165Hz in system settings or 185Hz via the Game Genie app. The panel also supports HDR10, reaches 2,500 nits peak brightness (1,600 nits in high-brightness mode), covers over 107% DCI-P3, and is protected by Gorilla Glass Victus 2.

== Camera ==
Carrying from the ROG Phone 8 series, ROG Phone 9 series also has the triple camera module. On the ROG Phone 9 model, ASUS upgrades the 50MP main camera to Sony Lytia 700 sencor with 6-axis Hybrid Gimbal Stabilizer 4.0, and paired with a 13MP ultrawide lens and a 5MP macro camera for close-up shots. While on the ROG Phone 9 Pro model, ASUS upgrades the rear block by replacing the macro lens with a 32MP telephoto camera offering 3× optical zoom and HyperClarity AI for sharper detail. Both models include a 32MP RGBW front-facing selfie camera with improved low-light performance and a wide 90° field of view, using pixel-binning to output 8MP images.

	ROG Phone 9	ROG Phone 9 Pro
Main Camera	Sony® Lytia 700: 50 MP image sensor - 1/1.56” large sensor size, F1.9 aperture, Gimbal OIS	Sony® Lytia 700: 50 MP image sensor - 1/1.56” large sensor size, F1.9 aperture, Gimbal OIS
Ultrawide Camera	13 MP, 120° ultrawide-angle camera	13 MP, 120° ultrawide-angle camera
Macro Camera	5MP Macro Camera	n/a
Telephoto Camera	n/a	32MP, f/2.4, OIS, 3X optical zoom
Front Camera	32MP RGBW sensor	32MP RGBW sensor
