= ROG Phone 3 =

Asus Smartphone

Asus ROG Phone 3
- Developer: Asus
- First released: August 2020
- Predecessor: ROG Phone II
- Successor: ROG Phone 5
- Compatible networks: 2G, 3G, 4G LTE and 5G
- Form factor: Slate
- Dimensions: 171 × 78 × 9.9 mm (6.73 × 3.07 × 0.39 in)
- Weight: 240 g (8.47 oz)
- Operating system: Android 11
- System-on-chip: Qualcomm Snapdragon 865+ Qualcomm Snapdragon 865 (Strix)
- CPU: ROG Phone 3 : Octa-core (1x3.1 GHz Kryo 585 & 3x2.42 GHz Kryo 585 & 4x1.8 GHz Kryo 585); ROG Phone 3 Strix : Octa-core (1x2.84 GHz Kryo 585 & 3x2.42 GHz Kryo 585 & 4x1.8 GHz Kryo 585)
- GPU: Adreno 650
- Memory: 8/12/16 GB RAM
- Storage: 128/256/512 GB UFS 3.1
- Battery: Li-Po 6000 mAh
- Rear camera: 64 MP, f/1.8, 26 mm (wide), 1/1.72", 0.8 µm, PDAF 13 MP, f/2.4, 11 mm (ultrawide) 5 MP, f/2.0 (macro) Dual-LED flash, HDR, panorama 8K@30fps, 4K@30/60/120fps, 1080p@30/60/240fps, 720p@480fps; gyro-EIS
- Front camera: 24 MP, f/2.0, 27mm, 0.9µm Panorama, HDR 1080p@30fps
- Display: 6.59-inch (167.4 mm) 1080×2340 FHD+ (2.5 MP) 144 Hz 391 PPI AMOLED capacitive touchscreen, 1B colors
- Sound: Loudspeaker with stereo speakers 24-bit/192kHz audio Active noise cancellation with dedicated mics DTS Headphone X
- Connectivity: WLAN Wi-Fi 802.11 a/b/g/n/ac/6, dual-band, Wi-Fi Direct, hotspot Bluetooth 5.1, A2DP, LE, aptX Adaptive GPS, with dual-band A-GPS, GLONASS, BDS, GALILEO, QZSS, GNSS NFC, USB 3.1, Two (side 3.1, bottom 2.0) Type-C 1.0 reversible connector; accessory connector
- Data inputs: Fingerprint (under-display, optical), accelerometer, gyro, proximity, compass, hall-effect sensor, barometer
- Other: Fast battery charging 30 W (Quick Charge 4.0, 3.0) Power bank/Reverse charging 10 W
- Website: www.asus.com/Phone/ROG-Phone-3

The ROG Phone 3 is an Android gaming smartphone made by Asus as the third generation of ROG smartphone series following the second generation ROG Phone II, announced on 22 July 2020.

== Specifications ==
=== Hardware ===
The ROG Phone 3's overall design is similar to its predecessor (the ROG Phone 2) - aluminum chassis and a glass backplate. It retains the RGB-illuminated logo on the back of the device which can be user-customized to show different colors. Two LED modules are located next to the camera, one of which acts as a flash and the other is an RGB LED used to light up the optional Lighting Armour case. The front of the phone features front-facing stereo speakers on either side of the display, and a camera built into the top bezel. The screen has a refresh rate of 144 Hz compared to the 120 Hz refresh rate of the ROG Phone 2, which can be configured to 60/90/120/144 Hz or Auto in the phone settings. The display itself is a 6.59-inch 1080p AMOLED panel with a 19.5:9 aspect ratio, which is protected by Corning Gorilla Glass 6 and supports DCI-P3 and HDR10+ with 270 Hz touch sensing. The device uses the Qualcomm Snapdragon 865/865+ SoC and Adreno 650 GPU, paired with 8, 12 or 16 GB of RAM and 128 GB, 256 GB, or 512 GB of non-expandable UFS 3.1 storage. Power is provided by a 6000 mAh battery, and 30 W fast charging is supported along with 10 W reverse charging. Signature features such as the 'vapor-chamber' cooling technology and custom double USB-C port on the side of the phone have also been carried over. The ultrasonic 'air triggers' now have motion-sensing abilities, and both can be split into two sub-triggers or used as slide gestures. Gaming accessories are also available including the AeroActive Cooler 3, the ROG Kunai Gamepad and Twinview Dock 3.

==== Camera ====
A triple camera system is used, with a primary sensor, an ultrawide sensor and a new macro sensor. The main lens has an upgraded Quad-Bayer Sony IMX686 64 MP unit, the ultrawide lens has a 13 MP unit, and the macro lens has a 5 MP unit. Users can select Night mode and Pro mode as well as HDR and Pro video capture modes. Video is now supported at 8K in addition to 4K, 1080p and 720p. Although it lacks OIS, it does have gyro-EIS and an advanced HyperSteady stabilization. The front camera has a 24 MP sensor . On first startup at welcome screen tap screen about 8 times to start scanning for a QR code.

=== Software ===
The ROG Phone 3 uses ROG UI, a modified Asus skin based on Android 11, but can be configured to use the standard ZenUI 6 found on the ZenFone 6, which functions very similarly to stock Android. The phone has several preloaded gaming-focused apps such as ASUS Armoury Crate which gives users advanced control over the hardware and software by allowing per-game performance profiles to be set up, as well as enabling detailed configuration of the RGB LEDs on the phone and its accessories. The phone also comes with Game Genie, which allows live configuration of phone settings in game and provides a moveable UI element displaying FPS, temperature and clock speeds. It also enables configuration of AirTriggers, game specific macros, silencing notifications and a record or live stream function.
