= Asus Zenfone 12 Ultra =

Smartphone by ASUS

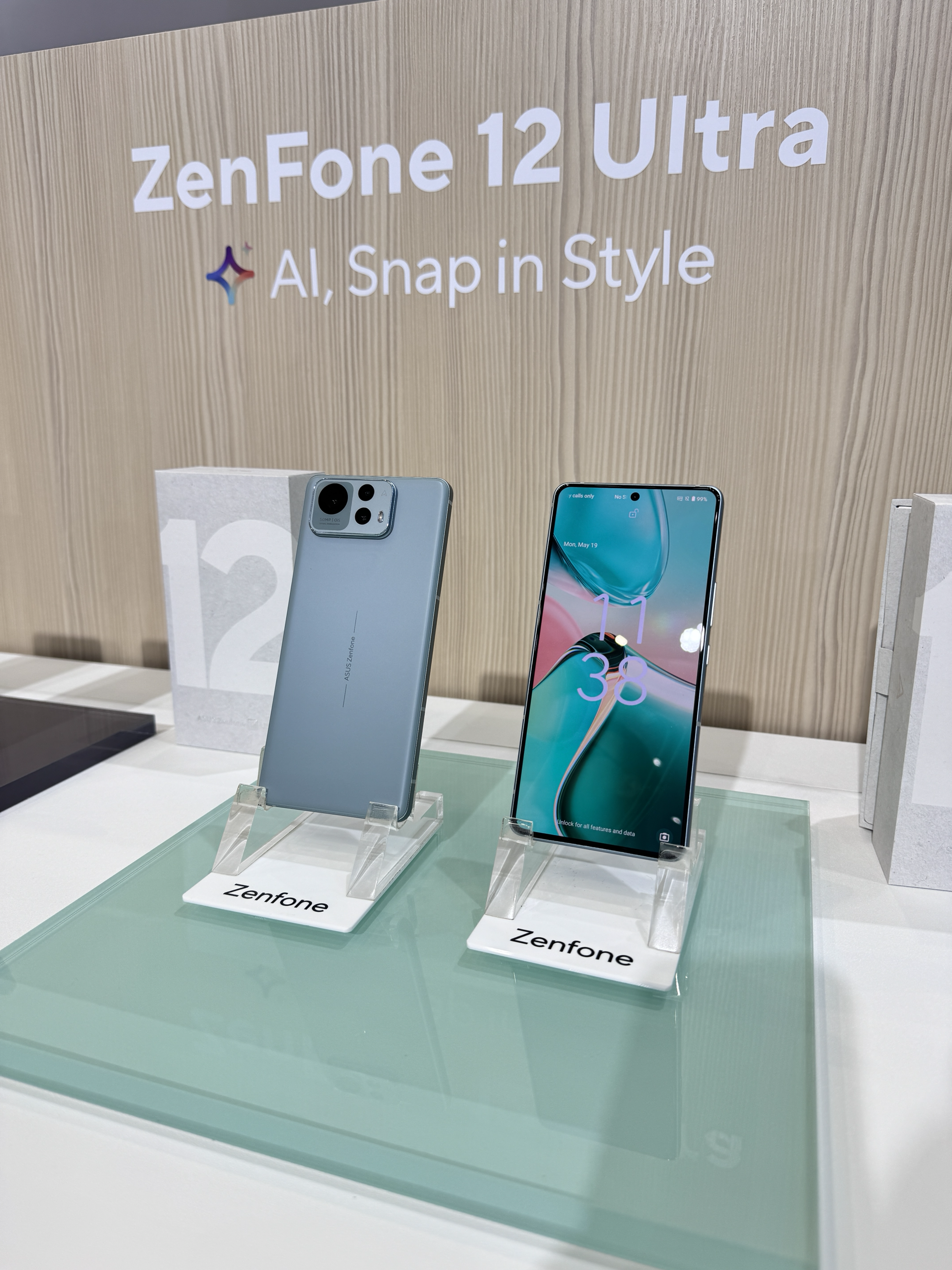
- Manufacturer: ASUS
- Series: Asus Zenfone
- First released: February 2025; 1 year ago
- Predecessor: Asus Zenfone 11 Ultra
- Related: ROG Phone 9
- Dimensions: 163.8×77.0×8.9 mm (6.45×3.03×0.35 in)
- Weight: 220 g (8 oz)
- Operating system: Android 15
- Storage: UFS4.0 256GB; UFS4.0 512GB
- SIM: Dual-SIM / Dual-Standby / eSIM support
- Battery: 5,500 mAh
- Rear camera: Main Camera: Sony® Lytia 700, 50 MP, f/1.78, 23.8 mm (wide); Second Camera: 13 MP, 12.7 mm (ultrawide); Third Camera: 32 MP, 65.3 mm, 3x optical zoom (telephoto)
- Front camera: 32MP RGBW sensor Pixel binning 1.4μm (Actual output photo: 8MP) 22 mm equivalent focal length in 35 mm film camera
- Website: Zenfone 12 Ultra

The Zenfone 12 Ultra is a smartphone developed and marketed by ASUS, released on February 6, 2025. It features a 6.78-inch AMOLED display, a Snapdragon 8 Elite processor, and a triple-camera system. It is the second AI featured phone in the company's Zenfone product line, succeeding the Zenfone 11 Ultra from 2024.

== History ==
Just five days before the official launch, the Zenfone 12 Ultra's specs and images were leaked by WinFuture, a Germany-based online tech publication. This article criticized that Zenfone 12 Ultra was just a "slightly stripped-down version of the ASUS ROG Phone 9 Pro." Another technology news source, Android Police, also stated the same by publishing an article "The ASUS Zenfone 12 Ultra is basically an ROG Phone 9 Pro" on the same day of the official launch. At the time, there were more leaks being released from media outlets such as Digital Trends, PhoneArena and Gadgets 360.

On the official launch day (February 6, 2025), the Zenfone 12 Ultra was immediately available in Europe (except for UK), Taiwan and Hong Kong. On May 30, 2025, it was made available in Japan.

== Specifications ==
=== Design ===
The Zenfone 12 Ultra has a matte glass back, narrow display bezels, and rounded corners. The frame is made from 100% recycled aluminum, the screen contains 22% recycled glass, and the packaging is FSC-certified. The device is available in three color variants: Sage Green, Ebony Black, and Sakura White.

Color
Sage Green
Ebony Black
Sakura White

=== Display ===
The Zenfone 12 Ultra comes with a 6.78-inch FHD+ Samsung E6 flexible AMOLED display. It supports LTPO technology with a refresh rate ranging from 1 to 120 Hz, and up to 144 Hz in supported gaming scenarios. The display has a peak brightness of 2,500 nits and is protected by Corning Gorilla Glass Victus 2. It has full coverage of the P3 color space, and is compatible with HDR formats including Amazon HDR and YouTube HDR.

=== Chipset ===
The Zenfone 12 Ultra features the Qualcomm Snapdragon 8 Elite system on a chip, which features an octa-core design with 6 performance and 2 efficiency cores, and a Adreno 830 integrated GPU.

=== Memory & Storage ===
The device is available with either 256GB or 512GB of UFS 4.0 internal storage with 12GB or 16GB of LPDDR5X RAM respectively.

=== Camera ===
The Zenfone 12 Ultra has a triple-camera system. The main camera uses a 50 MP Sony Lytia 700 sensor with gimbal optical image stabilization (OIS). The secondary camera is a 13 MP ultrawide-angle lens with a free-form design to reduce distortion. The third camera is a 32 MP telephoto lens supporting 3x optical zoom.

The front of the device also has a 32 MP selfie camera.

== Release & Pricing ==
Zenfone 12 Ultra was available on the launch day (February 6, 2025) at a price of €1,099 (USD$1,142). Between February 6 and 28, it was also discounted by €100.

=== Availability by regions ===
Date	Regions
February 6, 2025	Europe (except the UK), Taiwan, Hong Kong
May 30, 2025	Japan

As announced by many media outlets, the Zenfone 12 Ultra was not sold in the US and the UK, unlike the ROG Phone Series and previous Zenfone generations.

== Reception ==
The Zenfone 12 Ultra received mostly positive reviews, with reviewers praising its battery and storage for its price, as well as its sustained performance. However, reviewers criticised its weaker photography capabilities and limited availability compared to other phones of similar price points.
