= ROG Phone =

Asus smartphone

Asus ROG Phone
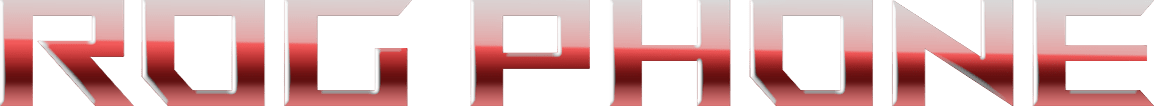

- The ROG Phone with its detachable external "AeroActive Cooler" accessory
- Brand: Asus ROG
- Manufacturer: Asus
- Type: Smartphone
- First released: October 18, 2018
- Successor: ROG Phone II
- Compatible networks: 2G, 3G, 4G, 5G
- Form factor: Slate
- Operating system: Original: Android 8.1 "Oreo"
- System-on-chip: Qualcomm Snapdragon 845
- CPU: Octa-core (4x2.96 GHz & 4x1.7 GHz) Kryo 385
- GPU: Qualcomm Adreno 630
- Memory: 8 GB LPDDR4 RAM
- Storage: UFS2.1 128GB / 512GB
- Battery: 4000 mAh Li-Po, non removable
- Rear camera: 13 MP (f/1.8, 4-axis) + 8 MP, active autofocus, LED flash 2160p@30fps, HDR
- Front camera: 8 MP, f/2.0
- Display: 6.0 in (152 mm) 1080×2160 FHD+ AMOLED
- Sound: Stereo dual front-facing speakers
- Connectivity: USB-C 1.0 reversible connector + 802.11 a/b/g/n/ac/ad Wi-fi, dual-band + Bluetooth 5.0 + NFC + Radio + GPS
- Data inputs: Fingerprint (rear-mounted), accelerometer, gyro, proximity, compass, hall-effect sensor, barometer
- Website: www.asus.com/us/Phone/ROG-Phone/

The ROG Phone is an Android gaming smartphone made by Asus and the first generation of the ROG smartphone series. It was announced on June 8, 2018 at the Computex computer expo, being the first Asus smartphone to be targeted mainly to gamers. It competes with the Razer Phone, Xiaomi Black Shark, and ZTE Nubia Red Magic.

== Specifications ==
=== Hardware ===
The ROG Phone has a metal chassis with a glass backplate. The back of the device features an RGB-illuminated logo (In X-Mode or Gaming Mode and also adjusted manually), which can be user-customised to show different colours, similar to the notification lights found in the mainstream smartphone market. The phone is equipped with a Qualcomm Snapdragon 845 SoC with a 3 GHz + 1.7 GHz octa-core (4+4) Kryo 385 CPU and an Adreno 630 GPU. The memory is 8 GB in size (LPDDR4), the internal storage can be chosen to be either 128 GB or 512 GB UFS 2.1. The display is a 6.0-inch AMOLED, supported by a Corning Gorilla Glass 6 panel, with a 1080x2160 (402 ppi) resolution, a 1ms response time and a refresh rate of 90Hz. The USB-C port and 3.5mm audio jack have been installed to the side of the device to allow a more comfortable gaming experience when using the device in landscape mode. It also features a 'vapor-chamber' cooling technology named GameCool which dissipates heat to keep the motherboard cool. The ROG Phone has IPX4 splash resistance and a custom double USB-C port which is used to connect the phone to its accessories.

=== Software ===
The phone OS is Android 8.1 Oreo with a modified Asus skin on top. The built-in sensors are a fingerprint scanner, an accelerometer, a gyroscope, and a barometer. Some areas of the edge are touch-sensitive and can be configured to mimic the additional keys found on traditional game controllers. The device also features a Nano SIM slot. The ROG phone features a so-called "X Mode", which optimizes gaming performance and restricts background apps.

== Accessories ==
A line of unique gaming accessories were unveiled alongside the phone itself. The "AeroActive Cooler", which is attached to the back of the device, helps keeping the device cool by acting as an external cooling fan. The "TwinView Dock" is a handheld dock which provides a secondary screen for the device and the dock has a memory card slot that support SD cards up to 512GB, though mini or micro SD cards require a full-size SD adapter to fit into the slot. Other accessories include a mobile desktop dock, the Gamevice controller that gives the phone physical controls and a WiGig dock for wireless screen casting to TVs without built-in screen casting.

== Reception ==
The Asus ROG Phone received positive reviews from critics. According to Business Insider, the phone was a great success due to high-end specifications causing gamers to use it for playing Mobile Legends without lagging.

It has gained some publicity for being the first smartphone with an external cooling fan.
