= ROG Phone II =

Asus Smartphone

Asus ROG Phone II
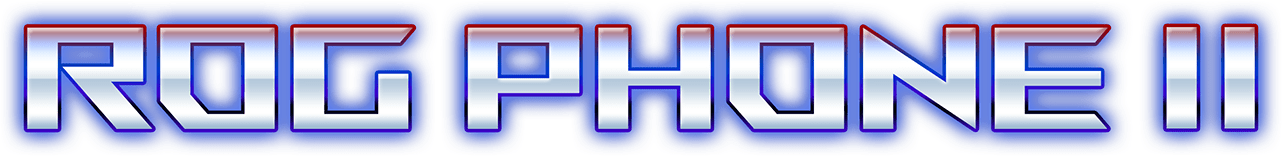

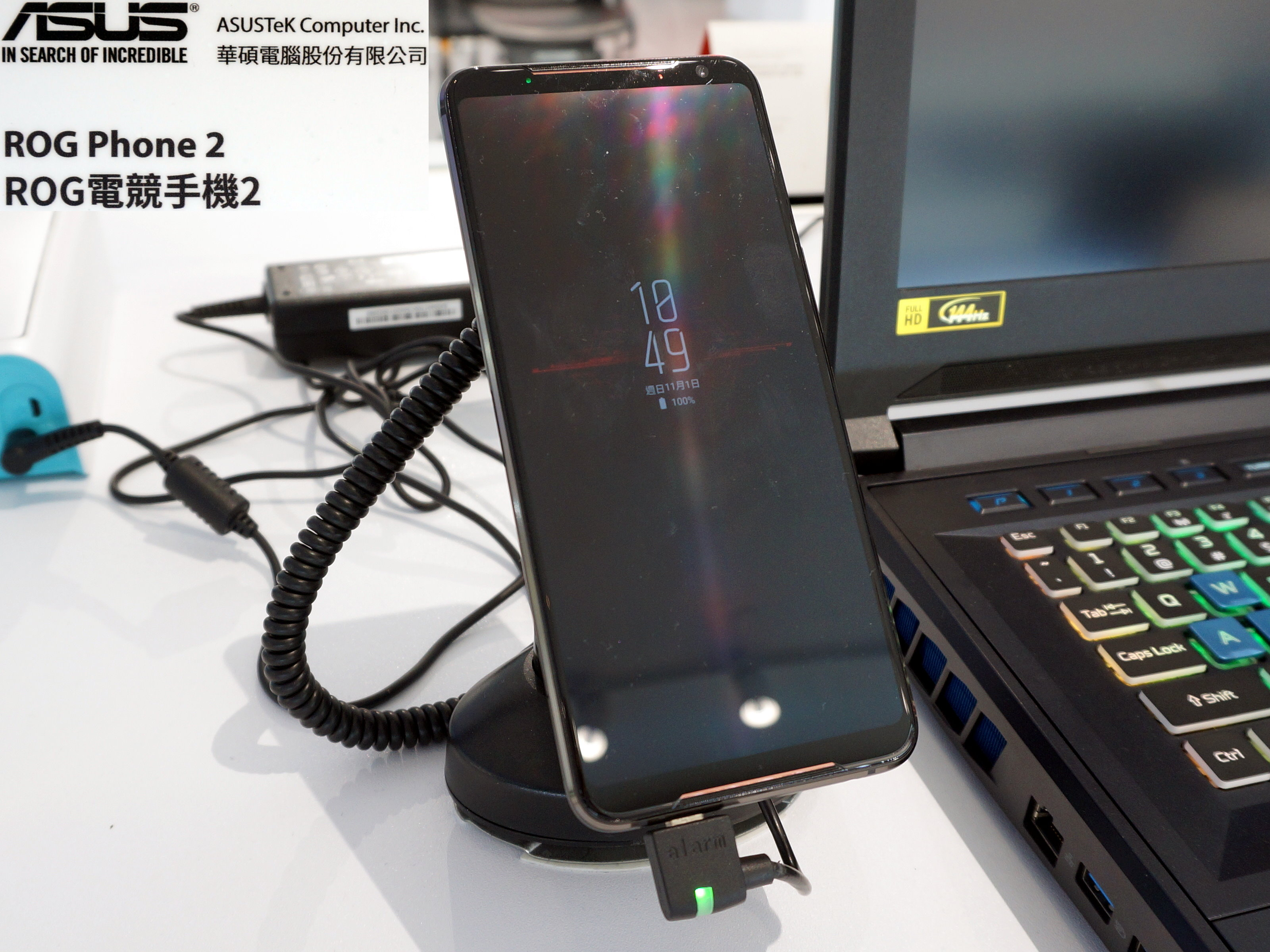
- Developer: Asus
- First released: September 2019
- Predecessor: ROG Phone
- Successor: ROG Phone 3
- Form factor: Slate
- Dimensions: 171 × 77.6 × 9.5 mm (6.73 × 3.06 × 0.37 in)
- Weight: 240 g (8.47 oz)
- Operating system: Android 9.0 "Pie"
- System-on-chip: Qualcomm Snapdragon 855+
- CPU: Octa-core (1x2.96 GHz Kryo 485 & 3x2.42 GHz Kryo 485 & 4x1.8 GHz Kryo 485)
- GPU: Adreno 640 (700 MHz)
- Memory: 8 GB or 12 GB RAM
- Storage: 128 GB, 512 GB, or 1 TB UFS 3.0
- Battery: 6000 mAh
- Rear camera: 48 MP, f/1.8, 26 mm (wide), 1/2", 0.8 µm, PDAF, Laser AF 13 MP, f/2.4, 11 mm (ultrawide) Dual-LED flash, HDR, panorama 2160p@30/60fps, 1080p@30/60/240fps, 720p@480fps; gyro-EIS (except @240/480fps)
- Front camera: 24 MP, f/2.2 Features Panorama, HDR Video 1080p@30fps
- Display: 6.59-inch (167.4 mm) 1080×2340 FHD+ 120 Hz AMOLED capacitive touchscreen, 16M colors
- Sound: Loudspeaker with stereo speakers, 3.5 mm headphone jack 24-bit/192kHz audio Active noise cancellation with dedicated mics DTS Headphone X
- Connectivity: WLAN Wi-Fi 802.11 a/b/g/n/ac/ad, dual-band, Wi-Fi Direct, hotspot Bluetooth 5.0, A2DP, LE, aptX HD GPS, with dual-band A-GPS, GLONASS, BDS, GALILEO, QZSS NFC, USB 3.1, Type-C 1.0 reversible connector; accessory connector
- Data inputs: Fingerprint (under-display), accelerometer, gyro, proximity, compass, hall-effect sensor, barometer
- Other: Fast battery charging 30W (Quick Charge 4.0) Power bank/Reverse charging 10W
- Website: www.asus.com/Phone/ROG-Phone-II

The ROG Phone II is an Android gaming smartphone made by Asus as the second generation of ROG smartphone series following the first generation ROG Phone. The ROG Phone II was announced in July 2019 and competes with the Xiaomi Black Shark 2 Pro and ZTE Nubia Red Magic 3s.

== Specifications ==
=== Hardware ===
The ROG Phone II's overall design is similar to its predecessor, using a metal chassis and a glass backplate. It retains the RGB-illuminated logo on the back of the device which can be user-customized to show different colors. The fingerprint sensor is no longer located on the back, as an under-display optical sensor is used instead. Two LED modules are located next to the camera, one of which acts as a flash and the other is an RGB LED used to light up the optional Lighting Armour case. The front of the phone features front-facing stereo speakers on either side of the display, and a camera built into the top bezel. The screen has a refresh rate of 120 Hz compared to the 90 Hz refresh rate of the original ROG Phone, which can be configured to 60/90/120 Hz in the phone settings. The display itself is a 6.59-inch 1080p AMOLED panel with a 19.5:9 aspect ratio, which is protected by Corning Gorilla Glass 6 and supports DCI-P3 and HDR10 with 240 Hz touch sensing. The device uses the Qualcomm Snapdragon 855+ SoC and speed-binned Adreno 640 GPU, paired with 8 or12 GB of RAM and 128 GB, 256 GB, 512 GB or 1 TB of non-expandable UFS 3.0 storage. Power is provided by a 6000 mAh battery, and 30 W fast charging is supported along with 10 W reverse charging. Signature features such as the 'vapor-chamber' cooling technology and custom double USB-C port on the side of the phone have also been carried over. The ultrasonic 'air triggers' have been improved as well, with faster haptic feedback. Gaming accessories are also available including the AeroActive Cooler II, the ROG Kunai Gamepad and Twinview Dock II.

==== Camera ====
A dual camera system is used, with a primary sensor and an ultrawide sensor. The main lens has a new Quad-Bayer 48 MP unit, while the ultrawide lens has a 13 MP unit. Neither of the lenses has OIS, but the main lens has PDAF and Laser AF. Users can select Night mode and Pro mode as well. The rear cameras are capable of shooting 4K video at 30 or 60 fps in addition to 1080p at 30, 60 or 240 fps and slow-motion 720p at 480 fps. Gyro-EIS augments video, but it is not supported if 240 fps or 480 fps is used. The front camera has a 24 MP sensor which can record 1080p video at 30 fps. Both the front and rear cameras can film panoramas and utilise HDR.

=== Software ===
The ROG Phone II uses ROG UI, a modified Asus skin based on Android 9.0 "Pie", but can be configured to use the standard ZenUI 6 found on the ZenFone 6, which functions very similarly to stock Android. The phone has several preloaded gaming-focused apps such as ASUS Armoury Crate which gives users advanced control over the hardware and software by allowing per-game performance profiles to be set up, as well as enabling detailed configuration of the RGB LEDs on the phone and its accessories. The phone also comes with Game Genie, which allows live configuration of phone settings in game and provides a moveable UI element displaying FPS, temperature and clock speeds. It also enables configuration of AirTriggers, game specific macros, silencing notifications and a record or live stream function.

As of March 2020, the ROG Phone II now officially supports Android 10. As of February 2022, the ROG Phone II now officially supports Android 11
