= Kickstand =

Bicycle part

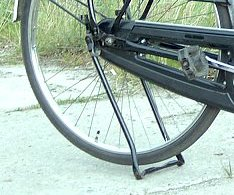
Kickstand on a Dutch utility bike

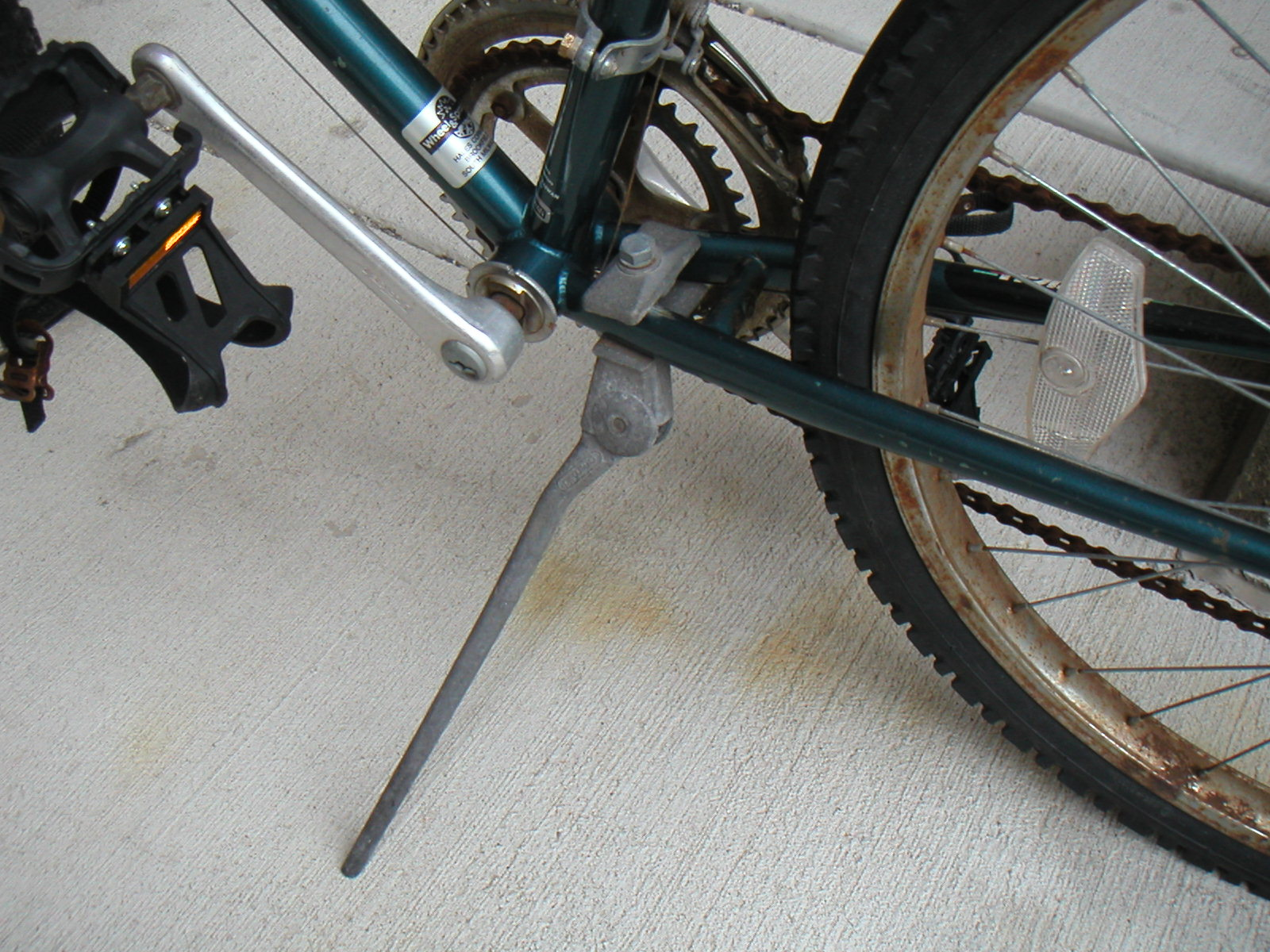
Cast aluminium side kickstand mounted to chain stays just behind bottom bracket

A kickstand is a device on a bicycle or motorcycle that allows the bike to be kept upright without leaning against another object or the aid of a person. A kickstand is usually a piece of metal that flips down from the frame and makes contact with the ground. It is generally located in the middle of the bike or towards the rear. Some touring bicycles have two: one at the rear, and a second in the front.

== History ==
The earliest known kickstand was designed by Albert Berruyer in 1869, and since then kickstands have been independently reinvented many times. It was mounted below the handlebars, so was much longer than more recent designs. A shorter model was patented by Eldon Henderson in 1926. In the 1930s, a "smaller, more convenient" kickstand was developed by Joseph Paul Treen.

In 1891, Pardon W, Tillinghast patented a design for a stand which was mounted on the pedal, but folded up flat under the pedal when not in use.

== Types ==
A side stand style kickstand is a single leg that simply flips out to one side, usually the left side, and the bike then leans against it. Side stands can be mounted to the chain stays right behind the bottom bracket or to a chain and seat stay near the rear hub. Side stands mounted right behind the bottom bracket can be bolted on, either clamping the chain stays, or to the bracket between them, or welded into place as an integral part of the frame.

A center stand kickstand is a pair of legs or a bracket that flips straight down and lifts the rear wheel off the ground when in use. Center stands can be mounted to the chain stays right behind the bottom bracket or to the rear dropouts. Many motorcycles feature center stands in addition to side stands. The center stand is advantageous because it takes most of the motorcycle's weight off its tires for long-term parking, and it allows the user to perform maintenance such as chain adjustments without the need for an external stand. Center stands are found on most "standard" and "touring" motorcycles, but are omitted on most high-performance sportbikes to save weight and increase ground clearance.

While not strictly a kickstand, the Flickstand is a small bracket that flips down from the down tube and engages the front tire to prevent the front end from steering and tire from rotating, and thus enabling the bike to be safely leaned against an object without danger of the front end turning and the bike subsequently falling to the ground. These were made by Rhode Gear Company in the 1970s and 1980s. While the Flickstand is no longer made, a Velcro strap can be employed for similar success by strapping a brake lever to lock the brake or strap the front wheel to the down tube.

== Construction ==
Kickstands can be made of steel or cast aluminium. There may be a rubber cap on the end.

Kickstands can lock in place, either up or down, by several means:

- A spring that is stretched when the kickstand is partway deployed and less stretched when it is stowed or all the way deployed.
- A detent mechanism, which usually also employs its own spring.

== Gallery ==
Kick stands

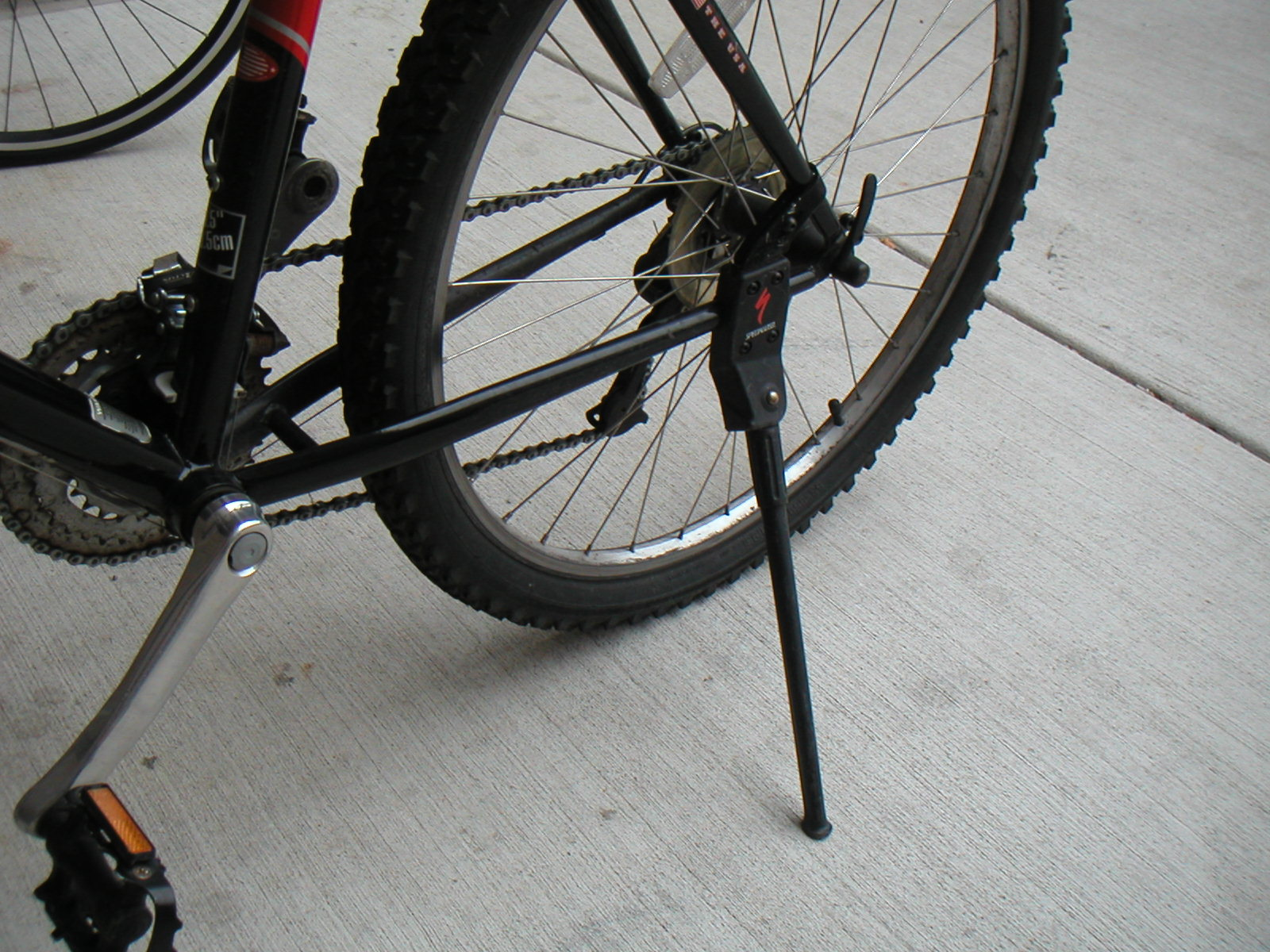
Side kickstand mounted to rear of chain stay and bottom of seat stay

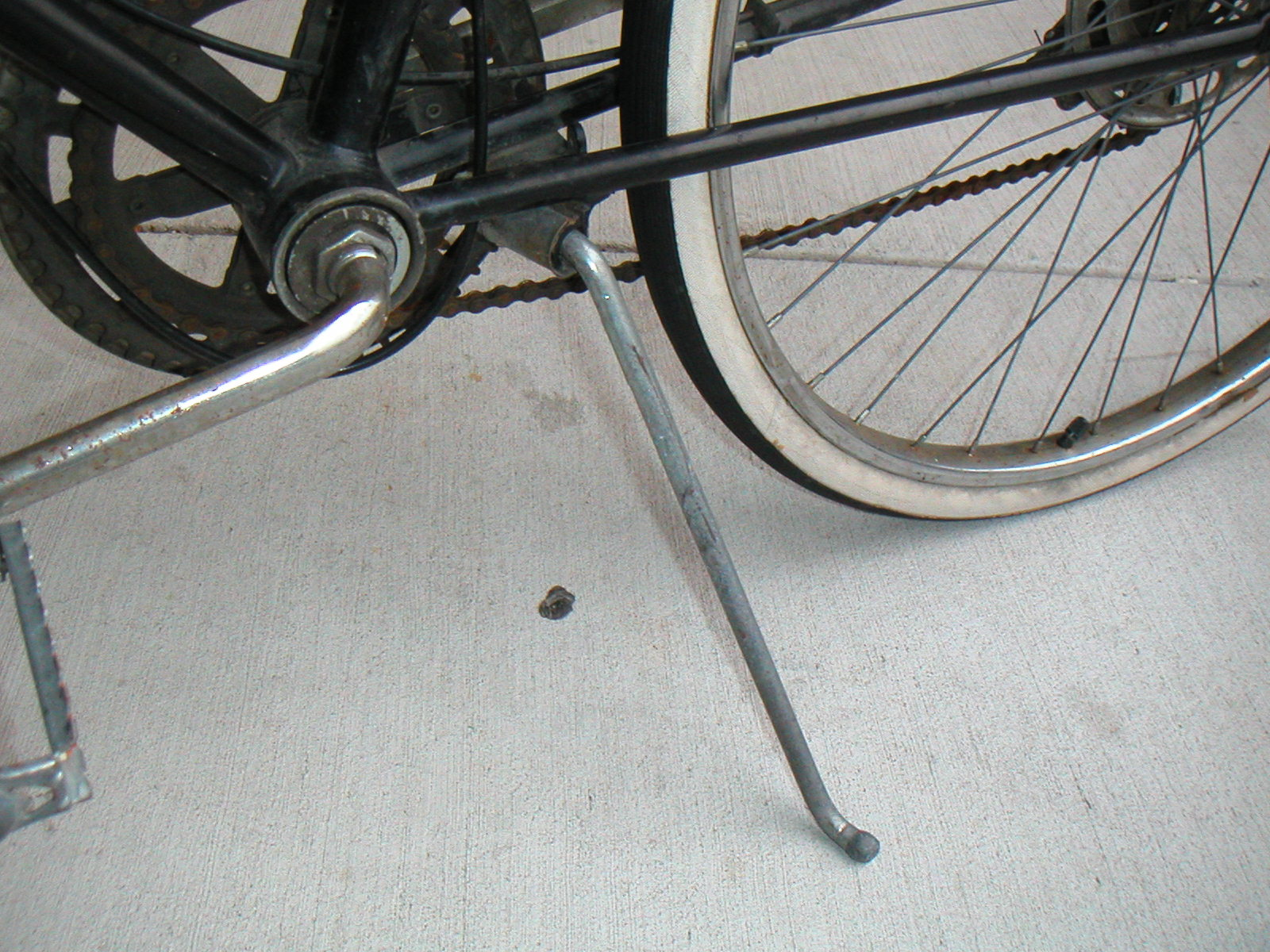
Steel side kickstand integrated (welded) into the bicycle frame

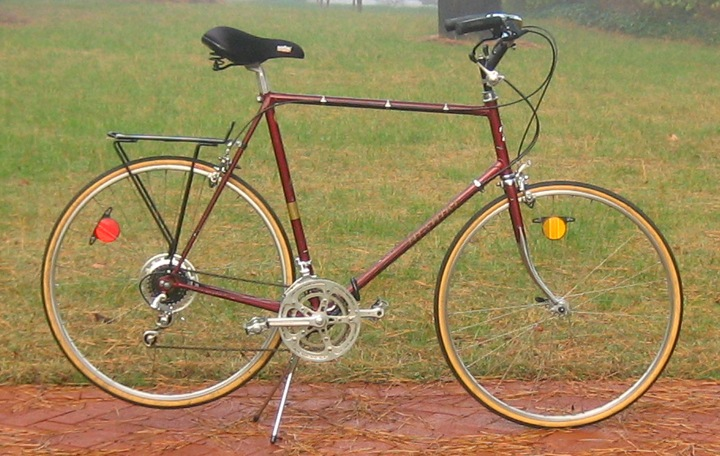
Center stand under the bottom bracket of a Nishiki

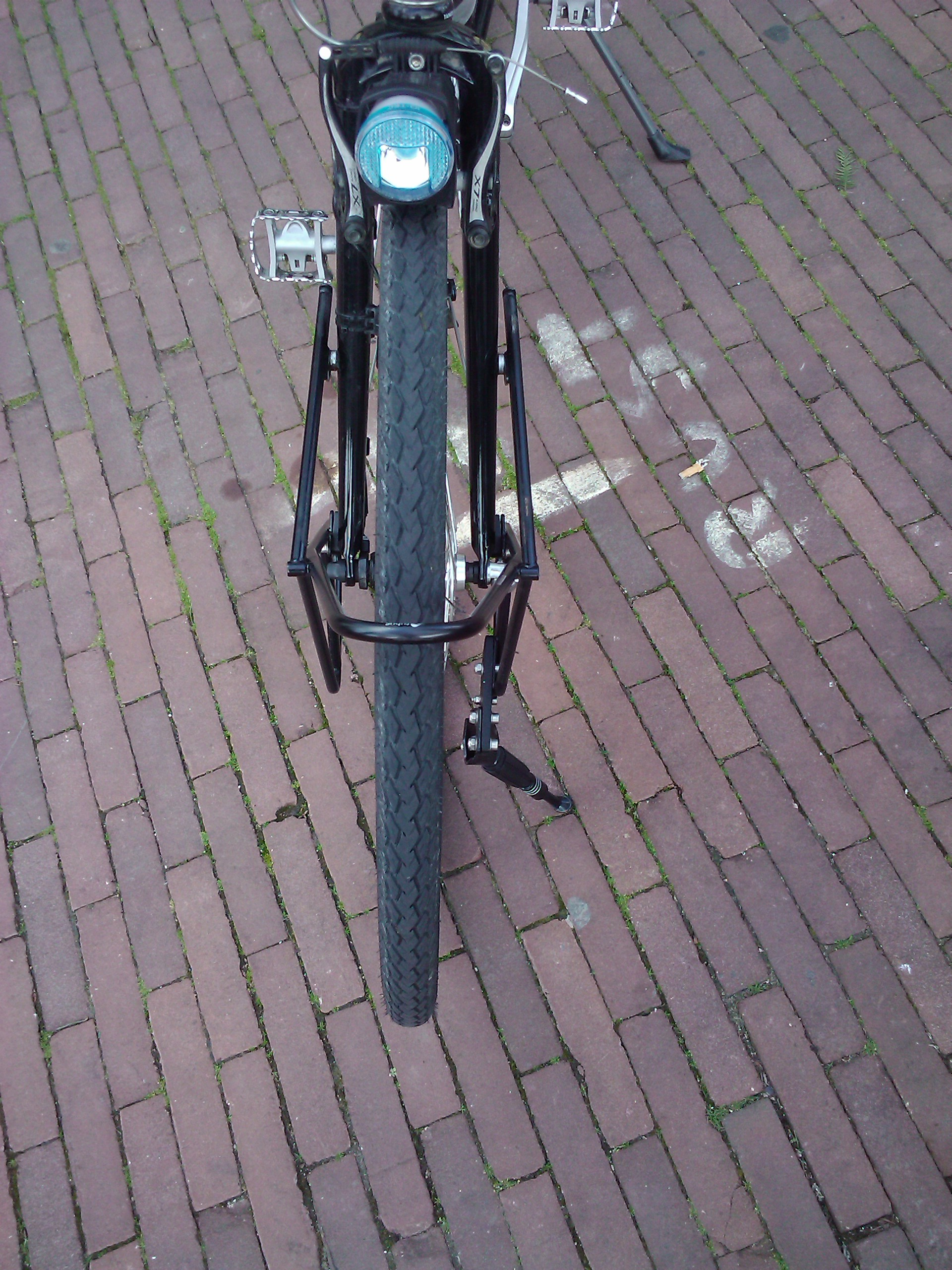
Forward kickstand attached to front rack. A rear kickstand is visible in the background

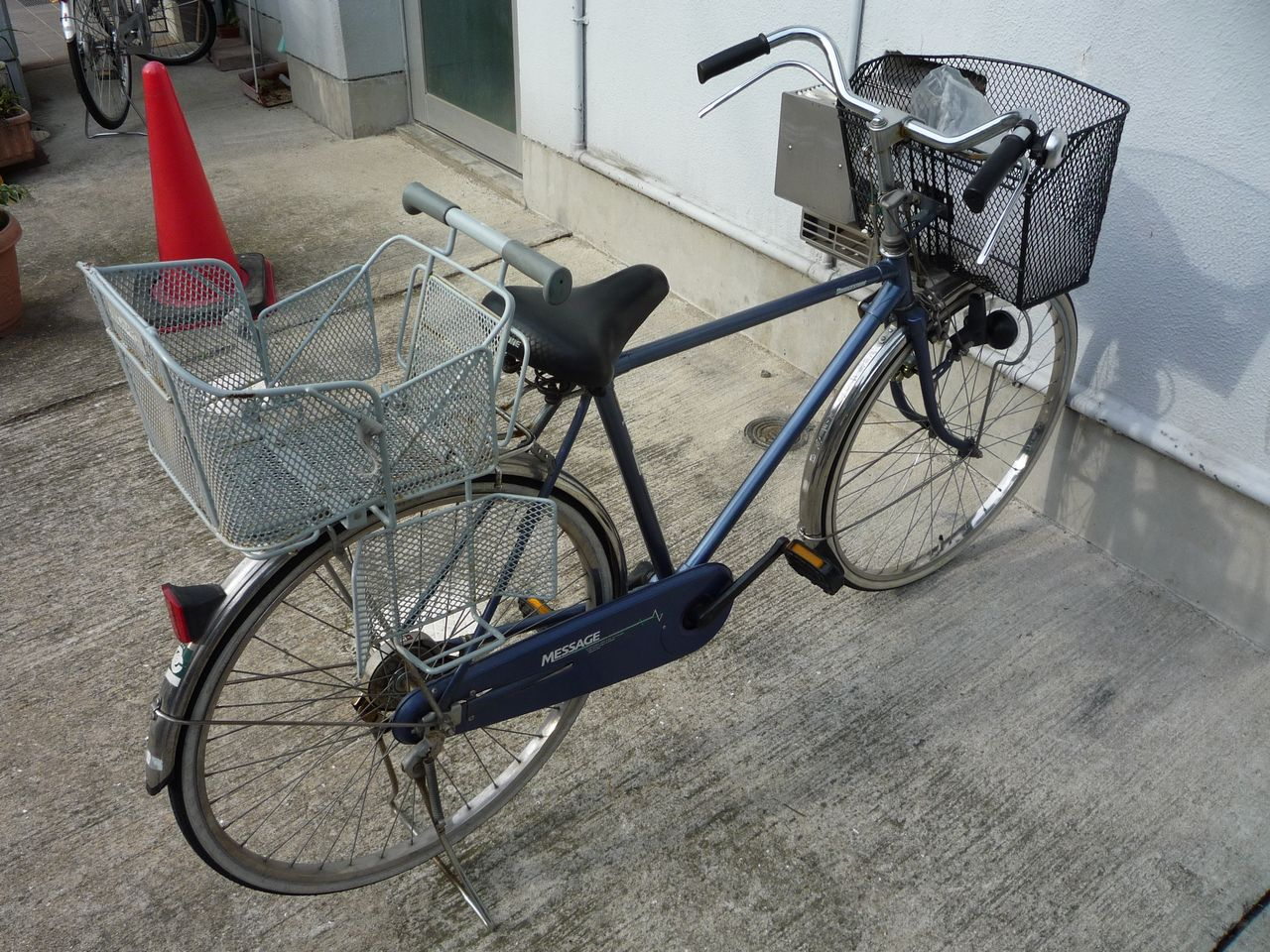
Kickstand of a Japanese style bicycle.

== See also ==
- ISIRI 13262
