= Republic of Gamers =

Computer hardware brand

- Product type: Gaming and enthusiast computer hardware
- Current owner: Asus
- Country: Taiwan
- Introduced: July 2006; 20 years ago
- Markets: Worldwide
- Tagline: For Those Who Dare
- Website: rog.asus.com

A Republic of Gamers retail store in Shanghai, China

Republic of Gamers (ROG; Chinese: 玩家共和國) is a gaming and enthusiast-hardware brand of the Taiwanese computer company Asus (ASUSTeK Computer Inc.). It is a product sub-brand of Asus rather than a separately incorporated company. Asus launched the line in 2006 for PC gamers and overclockers; the first product was the Socket AM2 ROG Crosshair motherboard, announced in July 2006. Asus also sells a separate, generally less expensive gaming range under the TUF Gaming name; reviews typically treat ROG as the higher-end of the two lines.

After the initial motherboards, coverage documented factory-tuned graphics cards and gaming notebooks, and later desktops, monitors, routers, smartphones, cooling and power-supply units, and peripherals under the same mark. Reviews of the 2023 ROG Ally treated handheld PCs as a further expansion of the lineup. Specialist publications have described ROG as a premium, performance-oriented brand associated with high-end motherboards and a wider gaming-hardware range. Independent reporting has also covered the brand as a hardware sponsor of esports events and teams. The brand uses the slogan "For Those Who Dare". It marked its twentieth anniversary in 2026 with commemorative hardware including a revival of the original Crosshair design.

== History ==
=== Founding and early years (2006–2008) ===
Asus announced the Republic of Gamers product series in July 2006, describing it as hardware for serious gamers and overclockers, and named the Socket AM2 Crosshair as the first board in the line. Contemporary coverage treated those first boards as enthusiast overclocking platforms rather than as a finished esports-peripheral ecosystem: reviewers highlighted onboard power and reset switches, lighting, and a diagnostic display used while tuning a system. The rear-I/O status screen, marketed as the LCD Poster, remained a talking point on the next Intel-socket ROG boards as well.

The early lineup split by CPU vendor. The original Crosshair used AMD's Socket AM2 and Nvidia's nForce 590 SLI chipset. In 2007 reviews, the Striker Extreme extended the same Republic of Gamers formula to Intel Core 2 builders on LGA775 and Nvidia's nForce 680i SLI chipset, again with an LCD Poster and a BIOS aimed at overclockers. A third early board, the P965-based Commando, was reviewed as a leaner Intel "tweaker's choice" in the same series. The early boards therefore already split by CPU vendor: Crosshair on AMD, and Striker Extreme and Commando on Intel. The first boards did not use the later eye emblem. Chinese and later English-language explainers have noted that the original Crosshair carried a blocky "G" mark, and that the stylised eye now called the Fearless Eye appeared afterward on the Asus G1 gaming notebook before spreading across the line. In Sinophone coverage the later mark is widely nicknamed 敗家之眼 ("spendthrift eye").

In November 2006 Asus unveiled the G1 and G2 as gaming-focused notebooks, with the smaller G1 and 17-inch G2 distinguished mainly by screen size, lighting, and GPU options. Hands-on and review coverage into 2007 framed the machines as Asus's entry into a market then associated with specialist makers such as Alienware. ROG entered discrete graphics in 2008 with the Matrix series. Trade coverage reported the official launch of the ROG EN9800GT Matrix as a follow-on to the earlier EN9600GT Matrix and described the cards as overclocking-oriented add-in boards.

=== Expansion (2009–2017) ===
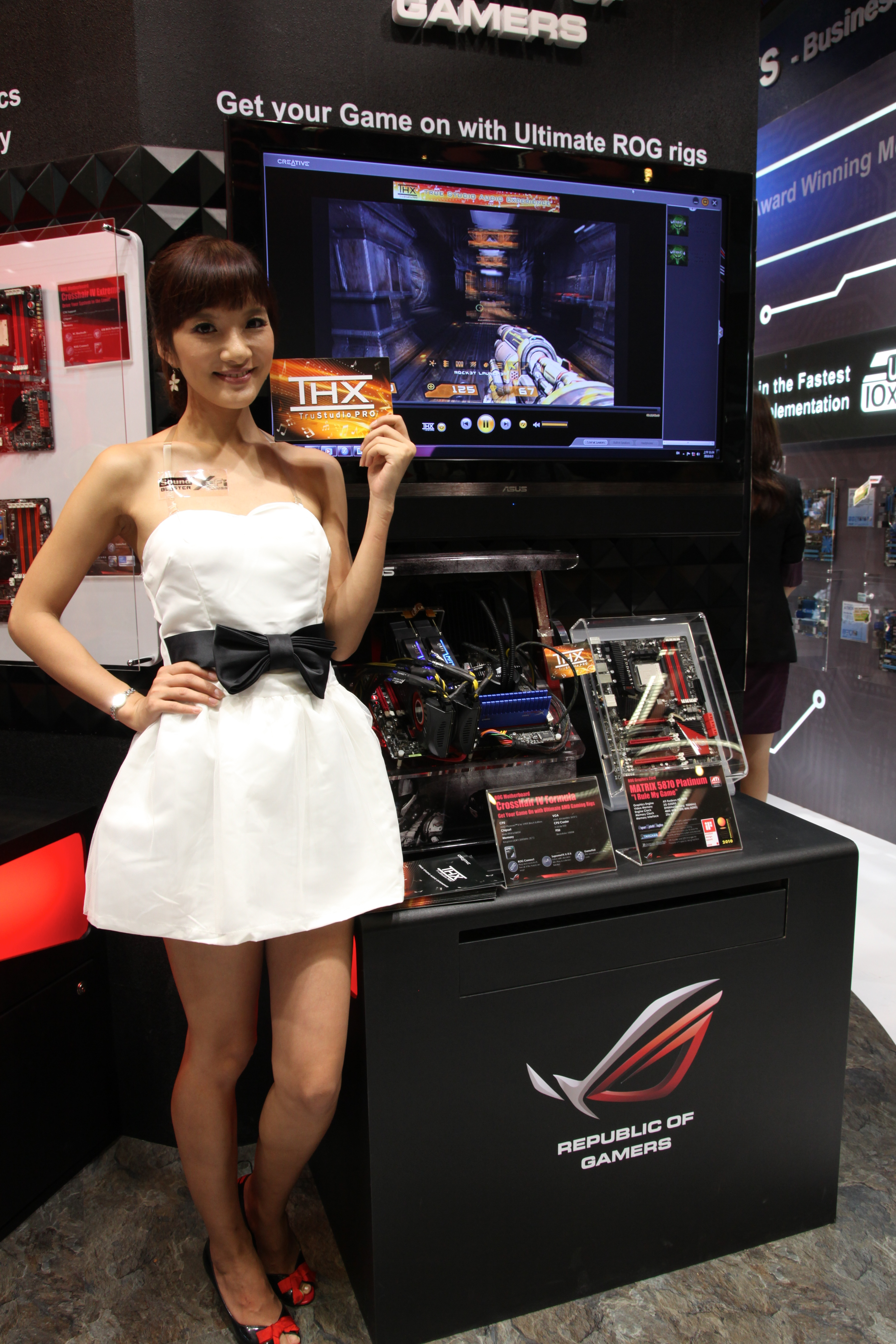
An Asus promotional model presenting ROG products in 2010

In 2008 reviewers treated the X48-based Rampage Extreme as a flagship Intel ROG board built around onboard overclocking controls, a diagnostic display, and a high price. Coverage from this period already distinguished Intel-oriented Rampage and Maximus boards from the AMD-oriented Crosshair line that had opened the brand. Through the early 2010s the brand remained closely identified with high-end motherboards and factory-tuned graphics cards. PC Gamer later wrote that Asus ROG motherboards had "rarely disappointed" since 2006 and that the line retained a loyal enthusiast following even as prices rose. Independent reviews of later Matrix cards continued to treat the name as an overclocking-focused ROG graphics sub-line rather than a mainstream GeForce or Radeon board.

Portable systems became a second pillar. At IFA 2015 Asus showed the ROG GX700, which reviewers described as the first gaming laptop to use an external liquid-cooling dock so that a 17-inch machine could run a desktop-class GeForce GTX 980 and an unlocked mobile CPU at higher clocks. CNET's hands-on preview likewise highlighted the docked water loop, G-Sync display options, and overclockable Skylake hardware as the machine's selling points.

In 2014 Tom's Hardware reviewed the ROG Swift PG278Q as the first finished G-Sync monitor to reach its labs: a 27-inch 2560×1440 display with a 144Hz refresh rate. PCMag likewise described the panel as a high-refresh WQHD gaming monitor built around Nvidia's G-Sync hardware. In 2017 Asus introduced the ROG Zephyrus GX501, which reviews credited with packing GeForce GTX 1070 or 1080 Max-Q graphics into a chassis about 18mm thick. TechRadar and IGN both described the design as an attempt to give desktop-class gaming performance in a much thinner notebook, using a hinged vent that opened with the lid. Asus Crosshair X670E Hero A premium X670E motherboard that's certainly not for users on a budget.

=== Modern era (2018–present) ===
ROG's product map widened again in 2018. At CES that year Asus and Korean League of Legends organization SK Telecom T1 introduced the limited ROG Strix SKT T1 Hero Edition laptop, which The Verge and Notebookcheck reported as the brand's first collaboration with the team and as a MOBA-oriented machine bundled with team merchandise and a Faker signature on the palm rest. The ROG Phone II was announced in July 2019 with a 120Hz OLED display, a Qualcomm Snapdragon 855 Plus chipset, and a 6,000 mAh battery. In June 2018 Computex coverage introduced the first ROG Phone as a high-refresh-rate Android handset built around mobile games such as PlayerUnknown's Battlegrounds.

Licensed hardware collections became a recurring late-period tactic. In 2022–2023 Asus released ROG × Evangelion components themed first on EVA-01 and then on Asuka's EVA-02, including a Maximus motherboard, Strix GeForce cards, an AIO cooler, and a Hyperion case; GameSpot covered the EVA-02 wave as a retail collection sold through Amazon and Newegg. In 2025, HardwareZone reported a separate ROG × Hatsune Miku parts kit that extended from a Strix X870E board and Astral GeForce RTX 5080 to a case, cooler, PSU, and monitor.

Handheld PCs became a major new form factor for the brand after the 2023 launch of the ROG Ally. The original model went on sale in June 2023 as a Windows handheld built around AMD's Z1 Extreme APU and a 7-inch 1080p 120 Hz panel; reviewers compared it with Valve's Steam Deck. Digital Foundry and Rock Paper Shotgun found higher raster performance than the Deck in many titles, while also noting Windows software and battery-life limits. The Verge later called the 2024 ROG Ally X the strongest Windows handheld it had tested to that point, citing a larger battery and revised ergonomics. Asus and Microsoft co-developed the ROG Xbox Ally and ROG Xbox Ally X, which launched on 16 October 2025 as Xbox-branded Windows handhelds with a controller-first interface.

At CES 2026 Asus and Kojima Productions showed the ROG Flow Z13-KJP, a limited Flow Z13 2-in-1 designed with artist Yoji Shinkawa and sold with matching headset, mouse, and mouse pad. A later Verge hands-on described a U.S. configuration that bundled a PC copy of Death Stranding 2: On the Beach.

ROG treated 2026 as its twentieth anniversary year. PC Gamer and Wccftech covered the ROG Crosshair 2006, an X870E board whose copper heatsinks and blue-and-white connectors were designed as a revival of the 2006 Crosshair. Taiwanese outlet 4Gamers reported a Taipei anniversary event that also showed T1-branded GeForce RTX 50-series cards alongside the commemorative board. Computex 2026 booth reports described a broader "Edition 20" set that included anniversary components and a translucent ROG Xbox Ally X20 handheld.

Selected ROG product and partnership milestones
Year	Event	Ref
2006	Crosshair motherboard and G1/G2 notebooks announced	
2008	Matrix factory-tuned graphics cards	
2009	Maximus III Formula established the Maximus name as ROG’s Intel flagship line	
2014	Swift PG278Q, an early retail G-Sync monitor	
2017	Zephyrus GX501 thin gaming notebook	
2018	ROG Phone; partnership with T1	
2023	ROG Ally handheld	
2025	ROG Xbox Ally handhelds	
2026	Twentieth anniversary; commemorative Crosshair 2006 motherboard	

== Products ==
=== Laptops ===
ROG notebooks are ASUS’s higher-end gaming laptop range. The first models, the G1 and G2, were released in late 2006. Contemporary reviews generally divide the current lineup into thinner Zephyrus models, higher-power Strix and Scar models, and convertible or detachable Flow machines.

ROG laptop series described in contemporary reviews
Series	Typical positioning	Ref
Strix / Scar	Higher-power notebooks. Within the thicker Strix models, Scar has been reviewed as the higher-priced, higher-power step, with larger displays and the top GPU options in a given year.	
Zephyrus	Thinner gaming notebooks	
Flow	Convertible or detachable machines	

==== ROG Strix/Scar ====
The Strix laptop line began in 2016 with the GL502, which Engadget reviewed as a mid-range VR-capable gaming notebook. In 2021, ASUS produced a one-off Strix SCAR 17 concept for skateboarder Nyjah Huston that was not sold commercially. Within the thicker Strix notebooks, Scar models have been reviewed as the higher-priced, higher-power step. Flagship Scar models remained in review coverage in 2024–2026, including the 18-inch Scar 18.

==== ROG Zephyrus ====
The Zephyrus line began in 2017 with the GX501, which reviewers described as a thinner high-end gaming notebook using Nvidia Max-Q graphics. In 2020 the line added the compact G14, reviewed as one of the first laptops built on AMD’s Ryzen 4000 series. That year ASUS also released a G14 collaboration with the design studio Acronym. In 2021 ASUS released a G14 special edition developed with DJ Alan Walker, which Notebookcheck reviewed.

Later Zephyrus models kept the thin-chassis approach; 2026 reviews of the G14 and G16 highlighted OLED panels and high-refresh screens in compact bodies. Some Zephyrus Duo models add a second screen above the keyboard; the 2026 Duo GX651 used dual 16-inch OLED panels.

==== ROG Flow ====
The Flow series was introduced in 2021 with the Flow X13, a compact convertible that could be paired with an external ROG XG Mobile graphics enclosure. Later models, including the Flow Z13, adopted a detachable tablet-style chassis with a kickstand keyboard. Reviews have described Flow as the most flexible of the three main ROG laptop lines, trading the higher sustained power of thicker Strix models and the thin-clamshell focus of Zephyrus for a convertible or detachable form. A 2026 limited-edition variant, the Flow Z13-KJP, was produced in collaboration with Kojima Productions and featured a Death Stranding-inspired design. The hands-on noted that the unit used the same AMD Ryzen AI Max+ platform as the standard 2025 Flow Z13.

Selected ROG laptop models reviewed in 2024–2026
Year	Model	Series	Notes from reviews
2024	Strix Scar 18 (G834)	Strix / Scar	18-inch Mini-LED display; reviewed with Core i9-14900HX and up to RTX 4090
2024	Zephyrus G14 (GA403)	Zephyrus	Compact chassis with OLED panel; reviewed with Ryzen 8000-series processors
2025	Strix Scar 16 (G635)	Strix / Scar	16-inch Mini-LED display; reviewed with Core Ultra 9 275HX and RTX 5080
2025	Flow Z13 (GZ302EA)	Flow	Detachable chassis using an AMD Ryzen AI Max+ processor with unified memory
2026	Strix Scar 18 (G835)	Strix / Scar	18-inch Mini-LED display; reviewed with high-end RTX 50-series configurations
2026	Zephyrus Duo (GX651)	Zephyrus	Dual 16-inch OLED panels
2026	Flow Z13-KJP	Flow	Limited edition developed with Kojima Productions; Death Stranding-inspired design

==== Awards ====
Several recent ROG laptops have received design or innovation awards. The 2025 Strix Scar 16 and Scar 18 received CES Innovation Awards. The same year’s Strix Scar and Strix G models were also recognized by the Taiwan Excellence awards. In 2026 the Zephyrus Duo received a Red Dot “Best of the Best” design award. The limited-edition Flow Z13-KJP received a COMPUTEX Best Choice award in 2026. The 2024 Zephyrus G14 was named an Editor’s Choice by Tom’s Guide, and Laptop Mag called the Strix Scar 18 its best gaming laptop at CES 2025.

=== Handheld PCs ===
==== ROG Ally ====
ROG Xbox Ally handheld gaming PC

ASUS announced the ROG Ally on 1 April 2023. The timing led some observers to treat the announcement as an April Fools’ joke until the company confirmed the device three days later. The Ally launched on 13 June 2023 with a 7-inch 120 Hz display and was the first device to use AMD’s Ryzen Z1 Extreme processor. Reviews positioned the Windows-based Ally as a competitor to the Steam Deck.

In 2024 ASUS released the ROG Ally X, which retained the Z1 Extreme processor but increased battery capacity from 40 Wh to 80 Wh and upgraded system memory to 24 GB. Reviewers described the Ally X as a refined version of the original handheld. The ROG Ally X received a 2025 iF Design Award.

In October 2025 ASUS and Microsoft released the ROG Xbox Ally and ROG Xbox Ally X. The models used AMD’s Ryzen Z2 A and Ryzen AI Z2 Extreme processors respectively and ran a full-screen Xbox interface on Windows 11. This was the Ally line’s first deep software integration with the Xbox brand. TechRadar later labeled the ROG Xbox Ally X “Best in Class” in its review. For ROG’s twentieth anniversary in 2026, ASUS showed a translucent ROG Xbox Ally X20 at Computex and later detailed a limited bundle that included the handheld with a 7.4-inch OLED panel.

Selected ROG Ally models reviewed in 2024 - 2026
Year	Model	Key specifications	Notes from reviews
2024	ROG Ally X	Ryzen Z1 Extreme, 7-inch FHD 120 Hz display, 24 GB LPDDR5X, 80 Wh battery	Battery capacity doubled from the original Ally; reviewers described it as a refined version of the original handheld.
2025	ROG Xbox Ally / ROG Xbox Ally X	Ryzen Z2 A / Ryzen AI Z2 Extreme, 7-inch 1080p 120 Hz display, Xbox full-screen interface on Windows 11	First deep software integration with the Xbox brand.
2026	ROG Xbox Ally X20	7.4-inch OLED 1080p 120 Hz display with FreeSync Premium Pro	OLED and larger-screen upgrade released for ROG’s 20th anniversary.

==== Awards ====
The ROG Ally X received a 2025 iF Design Award. It was also named an Editor’s Choice by PC Gamer, Tom’s Guide, and Laptop Mag, and received a “Best in Class” designation from TechRadar. The ROG Xbox Ally X was included in TIME’s Best Inventions of 2025 list in the Entertainment and Gaming category, and was labeled “Best in Class” by TechRadar.

=== Compact and full-tower gaming desktops ===
In January 2023 at CES, ASUS introduced the ROG G22CH, a 10-liter small-form-factor desktop. ASUS described it as nearly 40% smaller by volume than its previous G21CX Huracan while supporting up to an Intel Core i9-13900K and NVIDIA GeForce RTX 40-series graphics. The chassis later received a 2023 Red Dot Product Design Award and a 2023 Good Design Award.

In 2024 ASUS offered updated G22CH configurations that retained the same 10-liter chassis while supporting up to an Intel Core i9-14900KF paired with an NVIDIA GeForce RTX 4070.

In January 2025 ASUS launched the ROG G700, a full-tower desktop available with up to an Intel Core Ultra 9 285K or AMD Ryzen 7 9800X3D processor and up to an NVIDIA GeForce RTX 5090 (32 GB GDDR7). Configurations supported up to 64 GB of DDR5 memory and both air- and liquid-cooling options. The G700 later received a 2026 Taiwan Excellence Award.

In 2026 ASUS introduced the ROG G1000, a 104-liter ultra-tower featuring the AniMe Holo system, which ASUS describes as a full-color holographic fan display capable of projecting custom animations and images across multiple fan modules. Available configurations included up to an AMD Ryzen 9 9950X3D processor, NVIDIA GeForce RTX 50-series graphics, and up to 128 GB of DDR5 memory, with a dedicated 420 mm AIO cooler in a chamber ASUS calls the ROG Thermal Atrium. The G1000 Edition 20, a limited anniversary variant, received a Golden Award at the Computex Best Choice Awards 2026.

==== Mini PCs ====
ROG compact gaming PCs have included the GR8, GR6, GR8 II and ROG NUC. The GR8 was reviewed in 2014 as a console-sized computer combining an Intel Core i7-4510U processor with Nvidia GeForce GTX 750 Ti graphics. The GR6 received a separate review in 2015.

The GR8 II followed with a larger four-litre enclosure. Windows Central's 2017 review examined a configuration with a Core i5-7400 processor and GeForce GTX 1060 graphics. Later ROG NUC systems used laptop-class processors and graphics in a compact desktop chassis; TechRadar reviewed the 2025 model with GeForce RTX 5080 Laptop graphics.

Selected models in independent coverage
Coverage year	Model	Description
2014	GR8	Console-sized gaming PC using a Core i7-4510U and GTX 750 Ti.
2015	GR6	Compact gaming PC reviewed by AVForums.
2017	GR8 II	Four-litre gaming PC; reviewed configuration used a Core i5 and GTX 1060.
2025	ROG NUC (2025)	Compact gaming PC using laptop-class components.

===== Awards =====
The ROG NUC (2025) won the Best Gaming PC category in the 2025 TechRadar Choice Awards.

=== Motherboards ===
ROG motherboards began with the Crosshair in 2006, an AMD Socket AM2 board using Nvidia's nForce 590 SLI chipset. The early range subsequently included Intel-based models such as the Rampage Extreme, an X48 motherboard covered in 2008.

==== Crosshair, Maximus, Rampage and Zenith ====
The Crosshair and Maximus names have been used for AMD and Intel enthusiast boards respectively. Later examples include the AMD X570-based Crosshair VIII Dark Hero and Intel Z790-based Maximus Z790 Dark Hero. The Zenith Extreme extended the range to AMD's X399 platform for Ryzen Threadripper processors in 2017. ROG Strix boards have also covered less expensive platforms, including AMD B450.

Selected models in independent coverage
Coverage year	Model	Description
2006	Crosshair	Socket AM2 motherboard with nForce 590 SLI.
2008	Rampage Extreme	Intel X48 motherboard with onboard overclocking controls.
2017	Zenith Extreme	AMD X399 motherboard for Threadripper processors.
2019	ROG Strix B450-F Gaming	AMD B450 motherboard for the AM4 platform.
2023	Maximus Z790 Dark Hero	Intel Z790 motherboard for the LGA 1700 platform.
2026	Crosshair 2006	A later motherboard carrying the Crosshair 2006 name, distinct from the original 2006 board.

==== Awards ====
The Crosshair VIII Dark Hero won the motherboard category in PC Gamer's 2020 Hardware Awards.

=== Graphics cards ===
ROG graphics cards have included specialised overclocking models, dual-GPU boards and cards with alternative cooling arrangements. The Matrix GTX 285, reviewed in 2009, combined Nvidia's GTX 285 GPU with a customised board and cooling system. The Ares followed in 2010 with two ATI Radeon HD 5870 GPUs on one card.

The Poseidon GTX 780 combined air cooling with provision for a liquid-cooling loop. Later models included the triple-fan ROG Strix GTX 1080 and, in 2025, the four-fan ROG Astral GeForce RTX 5090.

Selected models in independent coverage
Coverage year	Model	Description
2009	Matrix GTX 285	Customised GTX 285 card with overclocking controls.
2010	Ares	Dual Radeon HD 5870 graphics card with 4 GB of video memory.
2014	Poseidon GTX 780	Cooling system usable with air cooling or a liquid-cooling loop.
2016	ROG Strix GTX 1080 Gaming A8G	GTX 1080 card with a triple-fan cooler.
2025	ROG Astral GeForce RTX 5090	RTX 5090 card with a four-fan cooling system.

=== Monitors ===
ROG gaming monitors have included high-refresh-rate desktop displays and portable monitors. The Swift PG278Q, reviewed in 2014, used a 27-inch, 2560 × 1440 TN panel with a 144 Hz refresh rate and Nvidia G-Sync. The later Strix XG16AHPE combined a 15.6-inch, 1920 × 1080, 144 Hz display with a built-in battery.

==== OLED monitors ====
The Swift range later incorporated OLED panels. The PG32UCDM used a 32-inch-class 4K QD-OLED panel operating at up to 240 Hz, while the PG27AQDP used a 27-inch, 2560 × 1440 OLED panel operating at up to 480 Hz. Both were reviewed in 2024.

Selected models in independent coverage
Coverage year	Model	Description
2014	Swift PG278Q	27-inch, 1440p, 144 Hz TN display with G-Sync.
2022	Strix XG16AHPE	15.6-inch, 1080p, 144 Hz portable display with a battery.
2023	Swift PG27AQDM	27-inch, 1440p, 240 Hz OLED display.
2024	Swift PG32UCDM	32-inch-class, 4K, 240 Hz QD-OLED display.
2024	Swift PG27AQDP	27-inch, 1440p, 480 Hz OLED display.

==== Awards ====
Tom's Hardware gave the Swift PG27AQDM an Editor's Choice designation in its 2023 review.

=== Display glasses ===
The ROG Xreal R1 is a wearable display developed with Xreal and reviewed by Tom's Hardware in July 2026. It uses 1080p micro-OLED displays and can connect to gaming devices through a control dock with HDMI and DisplayPort inputs.

The review distinguished the glasses' native 120 Hz refresh rate from the optional Frame Rate Boost mode, which uses processing to produce a 240 Hz presentation. The reviewer reported blur and jitter in some uses of the boosted mode.

=== Computer cases ===
ROG computer cases have included the Strix Helios, Z11 and Hyperion GR701. The Helios was reviewed in 2019 as a large enclosure with tempered-glass panels and carrying straps. GamersNexus criticised its thermal performance relative to competing cases.

The Z11 used an unusual internal layout for Mini-ITX builds. In a 2020 build report, Tom's Hardware found that its construction and access arrangements complicated assembly. The larger Hyperion GR701, covered in 2023, provided space for radiators up to 420 mm.

Selected models in independent coverage
Coverage year	Model	Description
2019	Strix Helios	Tempered-glass enclosure with carrying straps.
2020	Z11	Mini-ITX enclosure with a tilted motherboard layout.
2023	Hyperion GR701	Full-tower enclosure with support for large liquid-cooling radiators.

=== Mice ===
ROG gaming mice have included conventional wired designs, wireless models with additional controls and lightweight competitive-gaming models. The Gladius, reviewed in 2014, was a right-handed optical mouse with six buttons and a detachable cable. The Chakram added a thumb-operated joystick alongside wireless connectivity.

Later models included the Harpe Ace Aim Lab Edition, developed with Aim Lab, and the Keris II Ace. Tom's Hardware recorded a weight of 54 g for the Keris II Ace and polling rates of up to 4,000 Hz wirelessly or 8,000 Hz over a cable.

Selected models in independent coverage
Coverage year	Model	Description
2014	Gladius	Right-handed optical mouse with a detachable cable.
2020	Chakram	Wireless mouse with a thumb joystick.
2023	Harpe Ace Aim Lab Edition	Lightweight wireless model associated with Aim Lab.
2024	Keris II Ace	54 g wireless mouse with an included polling-rate booster.

==== Awards ====
The Keris II Ace received an Editor's Choice designation from Tom's Hardware in 2024.

=== Keyboards ===
ROG mechanical keyboards have included full-size, modular and compact layouts. Early coverage included the Horus GK2000 in 2016. The Claymore, reviewed in 2017, used Cherry MX switches and a detachable number pad that could be attached to either side of the keyboard.

==== Compact and customisable keyboards ====
The Strix Scope II 96 Wireless retained a number pad in a compact layout and offered hot-swappable switches. The Falchion Ace HFX used magnetic switches in a 65% layout. The Azoth X combined hot-swappable switches, an OLED display and wired, Bluetooth and 2.4 GHz wireless connections.

Selected models in independent coverage
Coverage year	Model	Description
2016	Horus GK2000	Mechanical keyboard covered in contemporary hardware reporting.
2017	Claymore	Mechanical keyboard with a reversible detachable number pad.
2023	Strix Scope II 96 Wireless	Compact keyboard retaining a number pad and hot-swappable switches.
2025	Falchion Ace HFX	65% keyboard with magnetic switches.
2026	Azoth X	Customisable keyboard with an OLED display and three connection modes.

==== Awards ====
The Strix Scope II 96 Wireless won the gaming-keyboard category in PC Gamer's 2023 Hardware Awards. PCWorld gave the Azoth X an Editors' Choice designation in February 2026, while also criticising its price and configuration software.
