= Asus ZenFone 4 =

Android smartphone

Asus Zenfone 4 (2014)
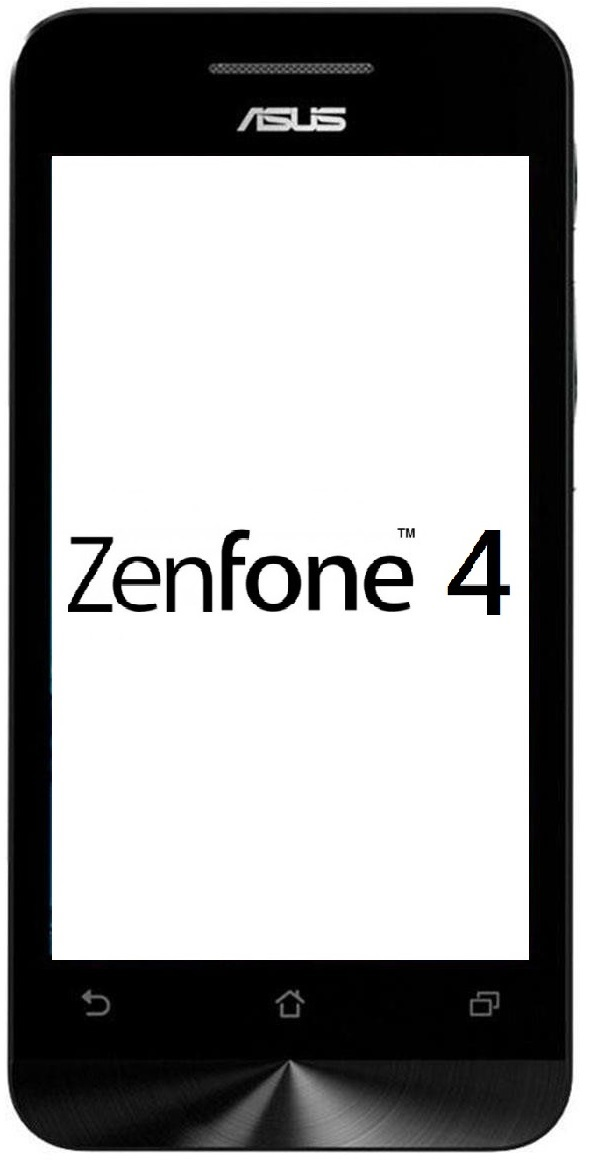
- Brand: Asus
- Manufacturer: Asus
- Type: Smartphone
- Series: Asus Zenfone
- First released: May 2014
- Discontinued: Yes
- Successor: Asus Zenfone C
- Related: Asus ZenFone 5 (2014); Asus ZenFone 6 (2014)
- Compatible networks: GSM, HSPA
- Form factor: Slate
- Colors: Charcoal Black; Pearl White; Cherry Red; Sky Blue; Solar Yellow
- Dimensions: 124.40×61.40×11.20 mm (4.898×2.417×0.441 in)
- Weight: 115 g (4.1 oz)
- Operating system: Android 4.3 (Jelly Bean), upgradable to Android 4.4 (KitKat)
- System-on-chip: Intel Atom Z2520
- CPU: Dual-core 1.2 GHz
- GPU: PowerVR SGX544MP2
- Memory: 1 GB RAM
- Storage: 4 GB or 8 GB
- Removable storage: microSDXC (dedicated slot)
- SIM: Dual SIM (Micro-SIM, dual stand-by)
- Battery: Removable Li-Po 1170 mAh
- Rear camera: 5 MP, AF; Video: 1080p@30fps
- Front camera: Yes (VGA)
- Display: 4.0 in (102 mm) TFT LCD, Gorilla Glass 3; 480 x 800 pixels, 5:3 ratio (~233 ppi density)
- Model: T00I, A400CG, A400CXG

The ASUS ZenFone 4 (2014) is an Android smartphone manufactured by Asus as part of the first-generation ZenFone series. Alongside ZenFone 5 and 6, it was announced on January 8, 2014 at CES 2014 and released in May 2014. It was rolled out to July 17, 2014 in Philippine markets.

== Specifications ==
=== Design ===
The ASUS ZenFone 4 features physical body dimensions of 124.4 mm in length and 61.4 mm in width, with a variable thickness that tapers from 6.3 mm at the edges up to 11.2 mm at its thickest point. The smartphone weighs 115 grams and is constructed with a plastic casing that was offered in Charcoal Black, Pearl White, Cherry Red, Sky Blue, and Solar Yellow. The chassis houses a dual-SIM tray configuration, which accommodates dual Micro-SIM cards operating on dual stand-by networks.

=== Hardware ===
The device runs on an Intel Atom Z2520 system-on-chip, which integrates a dual-core processor running at 1.2 GHz alongside a PowerVR SGX544MP2 graphics processing unit. Memory configurations include 1 GB of RAM paired with either 4 GB or 8 GB of internal storage, which can be expanded further via a dedicated microSDXC card slot. Power is supplied by a user-removable Lithium-Polymer battery, which came in a 1170 mAh capacity.

=== Display ===
The handset features a 4.0-inch TFT capacitive touchscreen display with an approximate 59.6% screen-to-body ratio. It outputs a resolution of 480 x 800 pixels using a 5:3 aspect ratio, providing a pixel density of roughly 233 pixels per inch. For durability against scratches and daily wear, the display panel is shielded by Corning Gorilla Glass 3.

=== Cameras ===
For photography, the rear configuration consists of a single 5-megapixel primary camera that features autofocus capabilities. This main camera supports high-definition video capturing up to 1080p resolution at 30 frames per second. The front side of the smartphone includes a basic secondary camera capable of capturing casual selfies and accommodating video calls.

=== Software ===
The ZenFone 4 originally shipped with the Android 4.3 Jelly Bean operating system, which was layered with Asus's custom ZenUI user interface. The user interface was later made officially upgradable to Android 4.4 KitKat in October 2014 and Android 5.0 Lollipop in June 2015.

The pre-installed software suites utilize the hardware's onboard hardware sensors, which include an accelerometer and a proximity sensor.
