= Samsung Galaxy Pocket Duos =

Samsung Android smartphone released in September 2012

- Manufacturer: Samsung
- Series: Galaxy
- Successor: Samsung Galaxy Pocket Neo
- Form factor: Slate
- Dimensions: 103.9×57.9×13 mm (4.09×2.28×0.51 in)
- Weight: 103 g (4 oz)
- Operating system: Android 2.3.6 (Gingerbread) with TouchWiz 3.0
- CPU: Broadcom BCM21553 ARMv6 832 MHz processor
- Storage: 3 GB(built in)
- Removable storage: MicroSD support for up to 32 GB
- Battery: Li-Ion 1200mAh or 1500 mAh
- Rear camera: 2.0 Megapixels (1600x1200 px)
- Display: QVGA TFT LCD, 2.8 in (71 mm) diagonal. 240 x 320 px, 16M colors
- Connectivity: 2G: 850 900 1800 1900 MHz; 3G: 1900 2100 MHz; HSDPA: 3.6 Mbps; Wi-Fi: 802.11b/g/n Bluetooth: v3.0 with A2DP
- Data inputs: capacitive touchscreen, accelerometer

The Samsung Galaxy Pocket Duos is an Android smartphone manufactured by Samsung that was released in September 2012. The handset is budget-oriented, sporting a relatively small 2.8-inch LCD. Its specifications are similar to that of the original Samsung Galaxy Pocket, only that it is dual sim capable. The Pocket Duos is powered by an 832 MHz processor and offers a set of connectivity options including 3G, Wi-Fi and Bluetooth 3.0. Internally, it comes with 3 GB of storage which can be further expanded to up to 32 GB using a microSD card, and with 1200 mAh Li-ion battery.

== Features ==
The Samsung Galaxy Pocket Duos comes with a tiny 2.80 inch QVGA Display. The device includes a 1200 mAh Li-ion battery, and offers a set of connectivity options including EDGE, HSDPA, Wi-Fi(b.g.n) and a Bluetooth connectivity. It also features GPS 2.0, a 2MP Rear Camera, Dual SIM capability and the Social Hub app. The Social Hub combines every account registered on the phone to be unified in a single app. The phone runs Samsung's TouchWiz 3.0 skinned Android 2.3.6 OS. The Samsung Galaxy Pocket Duos is marketed as "Pocket Friendly," because it can be slipped inside pockets easily.

== See also ==
- List of Android devices
- Samsung Galaxy Y
- Samsung Galaxy Mini
- Samsung i5500 (Galaxy 5)
