= Samsung Galaxy Pocket =

Android-based smartphone

Samsung Galaxy Pocket S5300

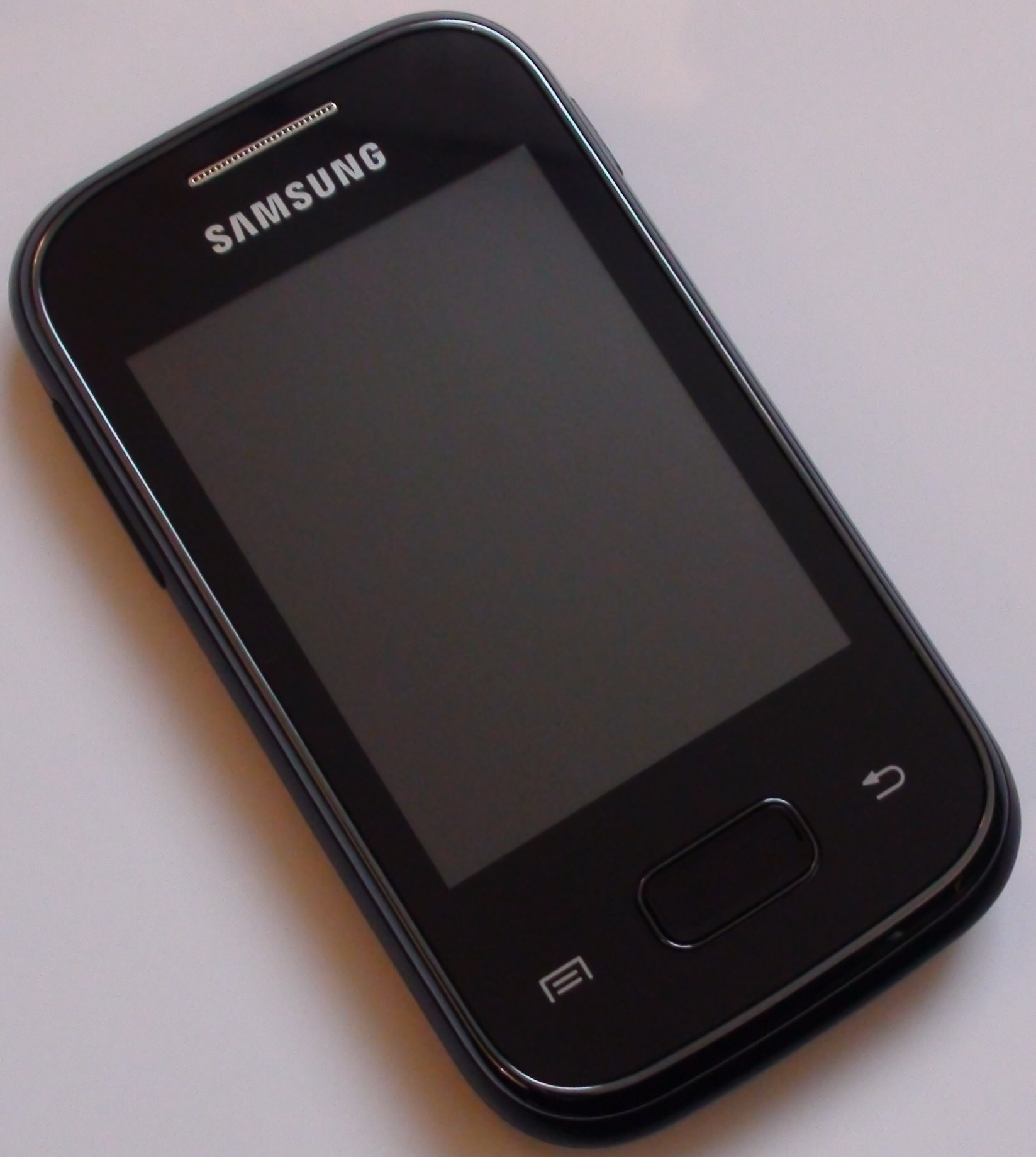
- Samsung Galaxy Pocket in Black
- Manufacturer: Samsung
- Series: Galaxy
- First released: April, 2012
- Predecessor: Samsung Galaxy Mini 2
- Successor: Samsung Galaxy Pocket Plus
- Compatible networks: 2G bands GSM 850 / 900 / 1800 / 1900; 3G bands HSDPA 900 / 2100
- Form factor: Slate
- Dimensions: 103.7×57.5×12 mm (4.08×2.26×0.47 in)
- Weight: 97.03 g (3 oz)
- Operating system: Android 2.3.6 (Gingerbread) with TouchWiz 3.0
- CPU: Broadcom BCM21553 ARM11 ARMv6 832 MHz processor
- Memory: 289 MB
- Storage: 3 GB
- Removable storage: MicroSD support for up to 32 GB
- Battery: Li-Ion 1200mAh
- Rear camera: 2.0 MP (1600x1200 px)
- Display: QVGA TFT LCD, 2.8 in (71 mm) diagonal. 240 x 320 px, 256K colors
- Connectivity: 2G: 850 900 1800 1900 MHz; 3G: 1900 2100 MHz; HSDPA: 3.6 Mbps; Wi-Fi: 802.11b/g/n Bluetooth: v3.0 with A2DP
- Data inputs: Capacitive touchscreen, accelerometer
- SAR: Head: 0.23 W/kg 1 g Body: 0.29 W/kg 1 g Hotspot: 0.29 W/kg 1 g

The Samsung Galaxy Pocket (GT-S5300) is an Android smartphone manufactured by Samsung that was announced in March 2012. The handset is budget-oriented, with a relatively small 2.8-inch LCD. Its specifications are similar to that of the Samsung Galaxy Y. The Pocket is powered by an 832 MHz processor and offers a set of connectivity options including 3G, Wi-Fi and Bluetooth 3.0. Internally, it comes with 3 GB of storage which can be further expanded to up to 32 GiB using a microSD card, and with a 1200 mAh Li-ion battery.

== Features ==
The Samsung Galaxy Pocket comes with a small 2.80-inch QVGA Display. The device includes a 1200 mAh Li-ion battery, and offers a set of connectivity options including EDGE, HSDPA, Wi-Fi (b/g/n), and Bluetooth connectivity. It also features GPS, a 2 megapixel rear camera, and the Social Hub app. The Social Hub combines every account registered on the phone to be unified in a single app. The phone runs Samsung's TouchWiz 3.0 skinned Android 2.3.6 OS. The Samsung Galaxy Pocket is marketed as "Pocket Friendly," because it can be slipped inside pockets easily due to its small size.

== Sales ==
The Samsung Galaxy Pocket was available to buy in the UK on 30 April 2012 for £95.99.

The Samsung Galaxy Pocket was available to buy in Botswana for P899.95

== See also ==
- Samsung Galaxy Pocket 2, with 3G
- Samsung Galaxy Pocket Neo, released in June 2013
- Samsung Galaxy Pocket Duos, with dual-SIM
- Samsung Galaxy Y
- Samsung Galaxy Mini
- Samsung i5500 (Galaxy 5)
