= Samsung Galaxy Pocket Plus =

Smartphone model

- Manufacturer: Samsung
- Series: Galaxy
- First released: January 2013
- Predecessor: Samsung Galaxy Pocket
- Successor: Samsung Galaxy Pocket Neo
- Form factor: Slate
- Dimensions: 104.9×57.9×12 mm (4.13×2.28×0.47 in)
- Weight: 97.2 g (3 oz)
- Operating system: Android 4.0.4 "Ice Cream Sandwich" with TouchWiz
- CPU: Broadcom BCM21654 ARM Cortex-A9 850 MHz processor
- Memory: 512 MB
- Storage: 4 GB
- Removable storage: MicroSD support for up to 32 GB
- Battery: Li-Ion 1200mAh
- Rear camera: 2 Megapixel
- Display: QVGA TFT LCD, 2.8 in (71 mm) diagonal. 240 x 320 px, 16M colors
- Connectivity: 2G: 850 900 1800 1900 MHz; 3G: 1900 2100 MHz; HSDPA: 3.6 Mbps; Wi-Fi: 802.11b/g/n Bluetooth: v4.0 with A2DP
- Data inputs: capacitive touchscreen, accelerometer

The Samsung Galaxy Pocket Plus also known as "Samsung GT-5301" and "gt-s5301" is an Android smartphone manufactured by Samsung that was released in January 2013 as the successor to the original Samsung Galaxy Pocket. The handset is still budget-oriented, with a relatively small 2.8-inch LCD. Its specifications are similar to that of the original Samsung Galaxy Pocket, with only minor upgrades such as the OS which is Android 4.0 ICS and the internal storage. The Pocket Plus is powered by an 850 MHz processor and offers connectivity options including 3G, Wi-Fi and Bluetooth 4.0. Internally, it comes with an upgraded 4 GB of storage which can be further expanded to up to 32 GB using a microSD card, and with 1200 mAh Li-ion battery.

== Features ==
The Samsung Galaxy Pocket Plus comes with a 2.80 inch QVGA Display. The device includes a 1200 mAh Li-ion Battery, and offers connectivity options including EDGE, HSDPA, Wi-Fi(b.g.n) and Bluetooth connectivity. It also features GPS 2.0, a 2MP Rear Camera, a single SIM slot and the Social Hub app. The Social Hub combines every account registered on the phone to be unified in a single app. The phone runs Samsung's TouchWiz Nature UX skinned Android 4.0.4 Ice Cream Sandwich. The Samsung Galaxy Pocket Plus is still marketed as "Pocket Friendly," because it can be slipped inside pockets easily. It has been highly preferred by people with visual impairments, mainly because of its Android 4.0.4 Ice Cream Sandwich operating system, as it functions well with explore by touch, unlike other Android versions.

== See also ==
- Samsung Galaxy Pocket Neo, successor released in June 2013
- Samsung Galaxy Y
- Samsung Galaxy Mini
- Samsung i5500 (Galaxy 5)
