= Samsung Galaxy Y Plus =

Smartphone model

- Brand: Samsung
- Manufacturer: Samsung Electronics
- Type: Smartphone
- Series: Samsung Galaxy
- First released: May 25, 2013; 13 years ago
- Predecessor: Samsung Galaxy Y DUOS
- Successor: Samsung Galaxy Young
- Compatible networks: GSM 850 / 900 / 1800 / 1900 - SIM 1 & SIM 2, HSDPA 900 / 2100
- Form factor: Candybar
- Dimensions: 104.9 mm (4.13 in) H 57.9 mm (2.28 in) W 13 mm (0.51 in) D
- Weight: 96 g (3.4 oz)
- Operating system: Android 4.0 Ice Cream Sandwich
- CPU: 850 Mhz Single core
- Memory: 512 MB of RAM
- Storage: 4 GB
- Removable storage: microSDHC supports up to 32 GB
- Battery: 1,200 mAh internal rechargeable Li-ion
- Rear camera: 2 megapixel (1600x1200), Video Recording 24@ fps 320x240 px (QVGA), Geo-tagging
- Display: 2.8 in (71 mm) TFT QVGA 240x320 px 256K Colors

The Galaxy Y Plus GT-S5303 is a mobile phone from Samsung. It was announced in March 2013 and was released in May 2013. It holds 2 SIM cards.

== See also ==
- Galaxy Nexus
- List of Android smartphones
- Samsung Galaxy Y
- Samsung Galaxy Young
