= Samsung Galaxy Pocket Neo =

2013 Android Budget Smartphone

Samsung Galaxy Pocket Neo (GT-S5310/GT-S5312/GT-S5310l (Value Edition))

- Samsung Galaxy Pocket Neo in Gray
- Manufacturer: Samsung
- Series: Galaxy
- First released: May 2013; 2014 (Value Edition)
- Predecessor: Samsung Galaxy Pocket Plus
- Successor: Samsung Galaxy Pocket 2
- Form factor: Slate
- Dimensions: 105×57.8×11.8 mm (4.13×2.28×0.46 in)
- Weight: 100.5 g (4 oz)
- Operating system: Android 4.1.2 Jelly Bean with TouchWiz Nature UX; Android 4.4.2 KitKat with TouchWiz Essence UX (Value Edition)
- CPU: Broadcom BCM21654 ARM Cortex-A9 850 MHz processor or 800 MHz ST-Ericsson Novathor U8800 Arm Cortex A9 dual core
- GPU: Videocore IV or Mali-400
- Memory: 512 MB or 768 MB RAM
- Storage: 4 GB
- Removable storage: MicroSD support for up to 32 GB
- Battery: 1200mAh Li-Ion
- Rear camera: 2 Megapixel
- Display: 3.0 inch QVGA TFT LCD, 240 x 320 px, 256K colors
- Connectivity: 2G: 850 900 1800 1900 MHz; 3G: 1900 2100 MHz; HSDPA: 7.2 Mbps; HSUPA: 5.76 Mbps; Wi-Fi: 802.11b/g/n Bluetooth: v4.0 with A2DP
- Data inputs: Capacitive touchscreen Accelerometer

The Samsung Galaxy Pocket Neo is an Android smartphone manufactured by Samsung. It was announced in March 2013 and released in May 2013 as the successor to the Samsung Galaxy Pocket Plus. The phone was officially discontinued in 2015,The primary reason Samsung discontinued the Galaxy Pocket Neo was a massive industry shift toward larger screen sizes and competitive entry-level hardware. The handset was budget-oriented, sporting a larger 3-inch display. Its specifications are similar to that of the Samsung Galaxy Pocket Plus, with only minor upgrades such as the Android 4.1.2 Jelly Bean operating system and the display size. The Samsung Galaxy Pocket Neo, like its predecessors, was marketed as "Pocket Friendly," because it could be slipped inside pockets easily despite the larger size. A Value Edition was released in a few continents including Africa, with a minor upgrade being an upgrade to Android KitKat instead of Android Jelly Bean.

== Specifications ==
=== Design ===
The Samsung Galaxy Pocket Neo is made of plastic. It has a 3.0 inch display; there is a "Samsung" logo, an earpiece and sensors at the upper bezel of the display while there is a physical home button and two capacitive buttons (menu and back buttons) at the lower bezel of the display. On the side frame; there is a volume rocker at the left, there is a power button at the right, there is a microUSB port and a microphone hole at the bottom, and there is a 3.5 mm headphone jack at the top. There is a rear-facing camera and a speaker at the back; the phone doesn't have an LED flash. The back cover is removable; removing the back cover reveals a removable battery, a microSD card slot and a SIM card slot.

It measures 105 x 57.8 x 11.8 mm and weighs 100 grams. It is available in white and gray.

=== Hardware ===
The Samsung Galaxy Pocket Neo is powered by Broadcom BCM21654/G system-on-chip with an 850 MHz single core ARM Cortex-A9 CPU. It comes with 512 MB of RAM and 4 GB of internal storage which can be further expanded to up to 32 GB using a microSD card. It has a 3-inch TFT LCD with QVGA (240x320 pixels) resolution and 133 ppi pixel density. It has a 1200 mAh Li-ion removable battery. Connectivity options include 3G, Wi-Fi 802.11 b/g/n, Bluetooth 4.0, GPS and GLONASS. It also features a 2 MP rear camera and is capable of video recording at 320x240 pixels resolution at 15 fps.

=== Special editions ===
Samsung released a Hello Kitty version of this phone.

=== Software ===
The phone runs on Android 4.1.2 Jelly Bean with Samsung's user interface TouchWiz Nature UX. It also includes the Social Hub app that combines every account registered on the phone to be unified in a single app. The Value Edition runs on Android 4.4.2 KitKat with TouchWiz Essence UX.

== See also ==
- List of Android devices
- Samsung Galaxy Young
- Samsung Galaxy Fame
- Samsung Galaxy Star
- Samsung Galaxy Pocket Plus
- Samsung Galaxy Pocket
