= Blue Earth =

Blue Earth may refer to a location in the United States:

- Blue Earth, Minnesota
- Blue Earth City Township, Minnesota
- Blue Earth County, Minnesota
- The Blue Earth River in Minnesota

== Other uses ==
- Blue Earth (album), an album by The Jayhawks
- The Samsung S7550 "Blue Earth" mobile phone
