= Samsung Galaxy Star =

2013 low-end Android smartphone by Samsung Electronics

Samsung Galaxy Star (GT-S5280/GT-S5282)
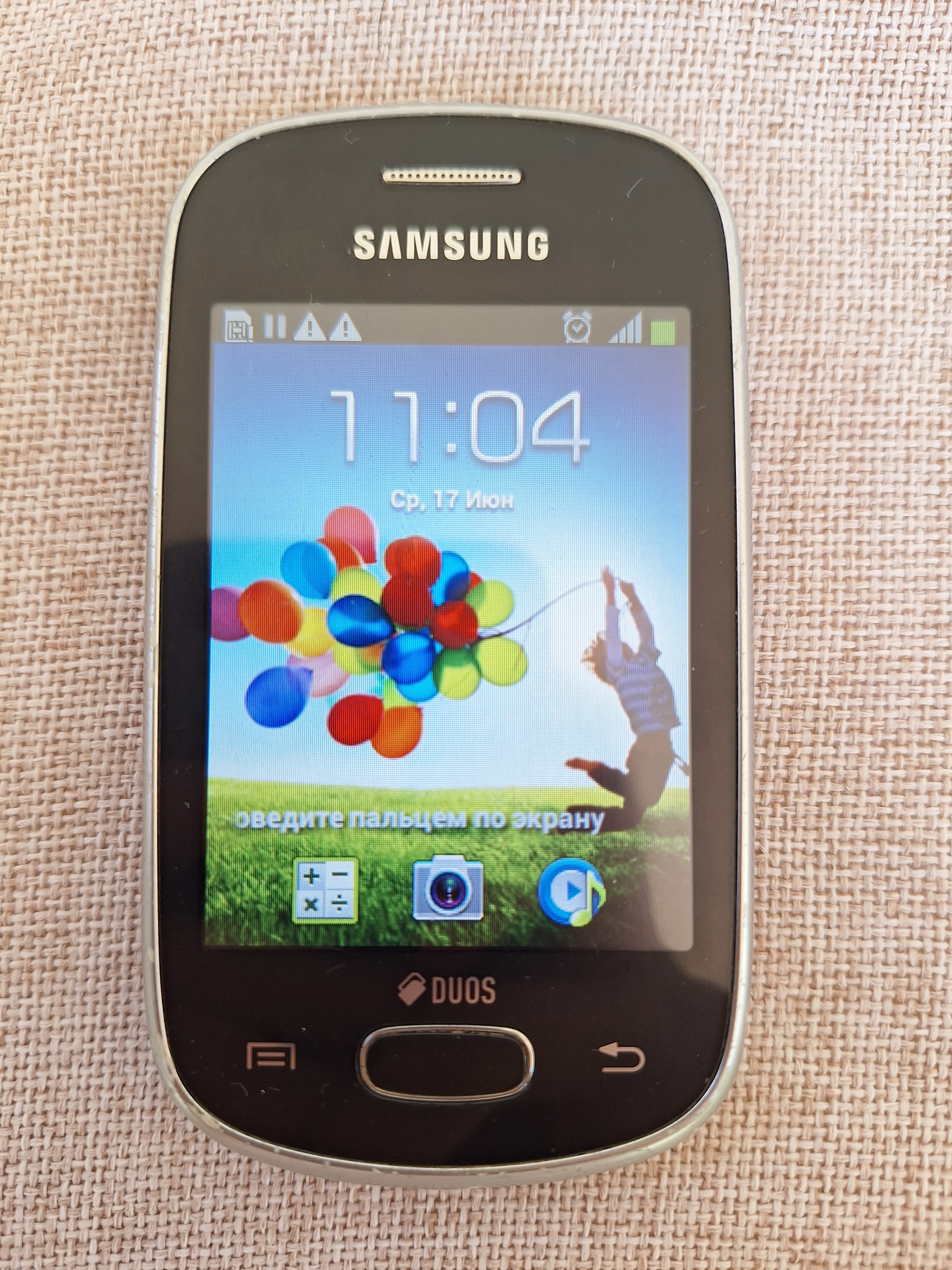
- A Samsung Galaxy Star GT-S5282 phone with Android 4.1.2 and TouchWiz Nature UX
- Brand: Samsung
- Manufacturer: Samsung Electronics
- Type: Smartphone
- Series: Samsung Galaxy
- First released: April 2013; 13 years ago
- Availability by region: May 2013; 13 years ago
- Successor: Samsung Galaxy Star Pro; Samsung Galaxy Star Plus; Samsung Galaxy Star Advance; Samsung Galaxy Star 2 Samsung Galaxy Star 2 Plus
- Related: Samsung Galaxy Young; Samsung Galaxy Fame; Samsung Galaxy Star Trios
- Compatible networks: GSM GPRS/EDGE 850, 900, 1800, 1900
- Form factor: Slate
- Colors: Midnight Black, Ceramic White
- Dimensions: 105.2×58.5×11.9 mm (4.14×2.30×0.47 in)
- Weight: 102.5 g (4 oz)
- Operating system: Android 4.1.2 "Jelly Bean" With; TouchWiz
- CPU: Spreadtrum SC8810 Single-core ARM Cortex-A5 at 1 GHz
- GPU: Mali-300
- Memory: 512 MB RAM
- Storage: 2 GB (including System storage)
- Removable storage: microSD support for up to 32 GB
- Battery: Li-ion 1200 mAh(internal) Standard battery
- Rear camera: 2 MP with 2x digital zoom, supports QVGA video recording
- Front camera: None
- Display: 3 inch 240x320 px QVGA LCD at 133 ppi
- Connectivity: microUSB, 3.5 mm audio jack, Bluetooth 4.0 with A2DP, Wi-Fi 802.11 b/g/n
- Data inputs: Multi-touch capacitive touchscreen, Accelerometer
- Other: ChatON; Samsung Apps; TouchWiz

The Samsung Galaxy Star is a low-end Android-based smartphone manufactured and developed by Samsung Electronics. It was announced in April 2013, and was subsequently released in May of the same year. It is a de-facto successor to the Samsung Star and the successor to the third entry in the Star series, the Samsung Star 3, other than it being one of the cheapest smartphones in the Samsung Galaxy series. Like all other Samsung Galaxy smartphones, the Galaxy Star runs on the Android mobile operating system.

The phone is available in 2 versions: a single SIM version (GT-S5280) and a dual SIM version (GT-S5282). The phone competes with other low-cost smartphones such as the smartphones from the Nokia Asha series as well as low-cost smartphones manufactured by Indian manufacturers such as Micromax, Karbonn, Spice Digital, Lava International and Celkon. It is available in certain Asian countries such as India, Pakistan, Sri Lanka, Nepal, Bangladesh, Myanmar, Philippines, Indonesia etc. where low-cost smartphones are very popular as well as in Morocco, Algeria, South Africa, Portugal (sold through TMN and MEO), France, Germany, Russia and Ukraine.

== Specifications ==
=== Hardware ===
The Galaxy Star follows the slate form factor for smartphones, and features a plastic exterior. The phone features a 1 GHz single-core ARM Cortex-A5 processor and a Mali-300 graphics processor, and comes equipped with 512 MB of RAM and 4 GB of internal storage, of which 2 GB is available to the user. The internal storage can be upgraded to 32 GB through the use of a microSD card. The device features an accelerometer intended to translate natural gestures into commands on the phone; for example, if the phone is ringing and the user turns it face down, it will stop ringing, or if the user wishes to establish a Bluetooth or wireless internet connection, they can shake the device and it will automatically connect. However, users have found that these gestures are often poorly recognised, resulting in the device performing unwanted tasks. It is not the first device to have these features; the HTC Desire Z introduced these features in 2010. It features a capacitive QVGA LCD touchscreen display which measures 3 inches with a resolution of 240x320 px at 133 ppi with multitouch support. It also provides a 2 MP rear camera with 2x optical zoom and QVGA video recording; however there is no front-end camera provided. The device requires the use of microSIM cards. The phone runs on a 1200 mAh lithium-ion battery. The Galaxy Star's battery drains quickly, but with moderate use on a single SIM, it can last up to 2 days.

==== Galaxy Star GT-S5282 ====
The Galaxy Star GT-S5280 and the Galaxy Star GT-S5282 are almost the same, with the only difference between them being that the latter is a dual-SIM phone, having another SIM card slot. Only one SIM is used at a time; a SIM card manager in the device is used to switch between them.

Galaxy Star GT-S5283

The Galaxy Star GT-S5283 also known as the Samsung Galaxy Star Trios is another version of the Galaxy Star released in February of 2014, seen from the "TRIOS" branding at the bottom shows that it's the only know Samsung phone to have Triple SIM capabillities. More info like the specifications can be seen here

=== Connectivity ===
Unlike most other smartphones, the Galaxy Star runs on EDGE networks alone, and doesn't support 3G connectivity. It also does not support GPS navigation. However it provides support for Wi-Fi connectivity and Bluetooth 4.0.

=== Software ===
Like all other Samsung Galaxy smartphones, the Galaxy Star runs on the Android mobile operating system. As with flagship phones sold in 2011, as well as low-end devices sold in 2012, Samsung only supports the latest version of TouchWiz on some low-end devices, beginning with the Samsung Galaxy Camera and Galaxy Star. Therefore, Samsung only supports Galaxy Star under TouchWiz Nature UX based on Android 4.1.2 Jelly Bean, and Samsung Kies blocks updates from being installed on Galaxy Star devices running versions other than TouchWiz Nature UX. Because of this, Samsung has stated that CPU usage is conducted in a more efficient way to ensure longer battery life. As with other Samsung smartphones, the device also uses Samsung's TouchWiz UX Nature user interface as the default user interface, though it is also possible to use other third-party user interfaces. By default, as in other Android smartphones, Google's products such as Google Chrome, Gmail, Google+, Google Hangouts etc. are provided in the phone. The device also has access to the Google Play store, but being a low-end smartphone, new applications as well as applications requiring a large amount of processing power and memory cannot be installed on the device. Samsung's applications such as ChatON and Samsung Apps are also preinstalled, as in other Samsung smartphones.

== Reception ==
The Samsung Galaxy Star has received mixed reviews upon its release. While it has been praised for its price, user experience and battery life, it has also been criticised for its small screen, lack of features and performance. Many users have found that the device's capabilities are basic, seeing it as a low-end smartphone.

According to The Times of India, the Galaxy Star looks "cute", has a decent screen, has a decent battery life and provides a good user experience, but has its drawbacks, with a small screen, low resolution and an underwhelming performance. ReviewGuidelines.com has praised the phone's memory, Wi-Fi, Bluetooth, touchscreen display and design, while criticising the lack of features and functionality. According to Techpinas.com, the Samsung Galaxy Star is a decent device capable of providing users with an adequate mobile experience. The screen is bare basic, yet this is understandable considering the device is a low-end smartphone. Furthermore, it excels in terms of basic functions such as web browsing and communications.

Many individual reviewers in the Internet have criticized the device due to its lack of a GPS, which has become the norm for modern day smartphones. Reviewers have agreed that the phone excels in terms of battery life, which is a result of Samsung modifying the operating system to control battery drainage. Despite the fact that the device has a 2MP fixed focus back camera, reviewers have found that the camera is capable of taking clear pictures with adequate picture quality.
