= Samsung Galaxy Young 2 =

Low-end smartphone by Samsung Electronics

Samsung Galaxy Young 2 (SM-G130HN, SM-G130H)
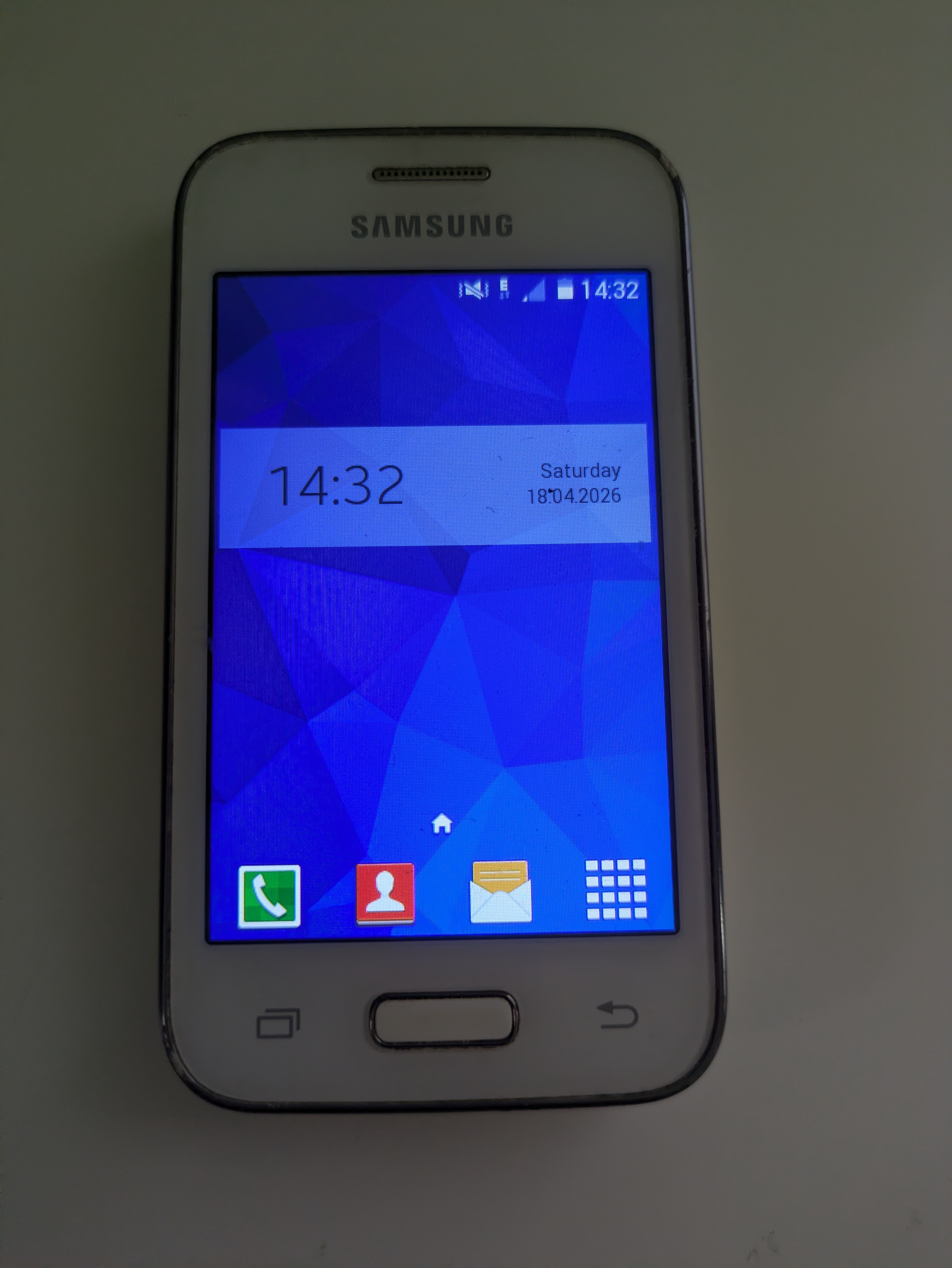
- Samsung Galaxy Young 2 (White variant)
- Brand: Samsung Galaxy
- Manufacturer: Samsung Electronics
- First released: June 2014; 12 years ago
- Predecessor: Samsung Galaxy Young
- Successor: Samsung Galaxy V Samsung Galaxy J1
- Form factor: Slate
- Dimensions: 109.8 mm (4.32 in) H 59.9 mm (2.36 in) W 11.8 mm (0.46 in) D
- Weight: 124 g (4.4 oz)
- Operating system: Android 4.4.2 KitKat With; TouchWiz
- System-on-chip: Spreadtrum SC6815A
- CPU: Single-core, 1GHz ARM Cortex-A7
- GPU: Mali-400
- Storage: 4 GB (2 GB available)
- Removable storage: MicroSD support for up to 32GB
- Battery: Removable 1300mAh EB-BG130BBE
- Rear camera: 3.15 Megapixel
- Display: 3.5 inches, 320 x 480 pixels (165 ppi) TFT LCD capacitive touchscreen, 256K colors
- Connectivity: USB 2.0, Bluetooth, Wi-Fi, Wi-Fi Direct, GPS Location, NFC

The Samsung Galaxy Young 2 is a low-end smartphone by Samsung Electronics which was released in June 2014. Like all other Samsung Galaxy smartphones, the Galaxy Young runs on the Android mobile operating system. It has a 3.5-inch TFT LCD touchscreen. The SM-G130H model is dual SIM capable. Many users have found the device's capabilities basic, seeing it as a low-end smartphone for children or teenagers who are having their first smartphone.

== Specifications ==
The device runs on Android 4.4.2 KitKat with Samsung's TouchWiz Essence user interface. It has a 1 GHz, single-core processor and 512 MB of RAM.

== See also ==
- Samsung Galaxy Fame
