= Samsung Galaxy Y DUOS =

Mobile phone by Samsung

- Brand: Samsung
- Manufacturer: Samsung Electronics
- Type: Smartphone
- Series: Samsung Galaxy
- First released: January 1, 2012; 14 years ago
- Successor: Samsung Galaxy Y Plus
- Compatible networks: GSM 850 / 900 / 1800 / 1900 - SIM 1 & SIM 2, HSDPA 900 / 2100 - GT-S6102; HSDPA 850 / 2100 - GT-S6102B
- Form factor: Candybar
- Dimensions: 109.8 mm (4.32 in) H 60 mm (2.4 in) W 12 mm (0.47 in) D
- Weight: 109 g (3.8 oz)
- Operating system: Android 2.3.6 Gingerbread
- CPU: 832 Mhz Single core
- Memory: 290 MB of RAM, 160 MB user accessible 512 MB ROM
- Storage: 2 GB, internal storage
- Removable storage: microSDHC supports up to 32 GB
- Battery: 1,300 mAh internal rechargeable Li-ion
- Rear camera: 3.15 megapixel (2,048 × 1,536), 2592x1944 px, Video Recording 24@ fps 320x240 px (QVGA), Geo-tagging
- Display: 3.14 in (80 mm) TFT QVGA 320×240 px 256K Colors
- Data inputs: Capacitive touchscreen TFT display

The Galaxy Y DUOS GT-S6102 is a mobile phone from Samsung. It was announced on 22 December 2011 and was released in February 2012. It can hold 2 SIM cards.

== See also ==
- Galaxy Nexus
- List of Android smartphones
- Samsung Galaxy Y
- Samsung Galaxy Y Pro DUOS
