= Samsung SPH-M520 =

Mobile phone

- Manufacturer: Samsung Electronics
- Availability by region: February 18, 2008
- Compatible networks: CDMA 800/1900, EVDO
- Form factor: Slider
- Dimensions: 4.01×2.04×0.5 in (102×52×13 mm) (10.2 * 5.2 * 1.27 cm)
- Weight: 2.75 oz (70 g)
- Memory: 16 MB embedded
- Removable storage: 256 MB MicroSD included (4 GB max)
- Battery: 4 hour Lithium ion
- Rear camera: 1.3 Megapixel
- Display: 176 X 220 px TFT LCD, 18-bit color
- Connectivity: Bluetooth 1.2, USB

The Samsung SPH-M520 (M520) is an Internet-enabled multimedia mobile phone, designed and marketed by Samsung Mobile. It uses a sliding keypad interface with talk interface buttons under the main screen. The M520, in addition to being a mobile phone, also functions as a camera phone with 1.3 MegaPixels, portable media player, text messenger, and a WAP 2.0 web browser and e-mail client.

Marketed as a replacement to the SPH-M510, Sprint's first EVDO slider, the M520 became available on February 18, 2008.

Critical reception to the phone was mostly positive.
