= Samsung GT-E1200 =

Mobile phone

Samsung E1200 (GT-E1200, GT-E1200R, GT-E1200i, GT-E1207T, GT-E1215)
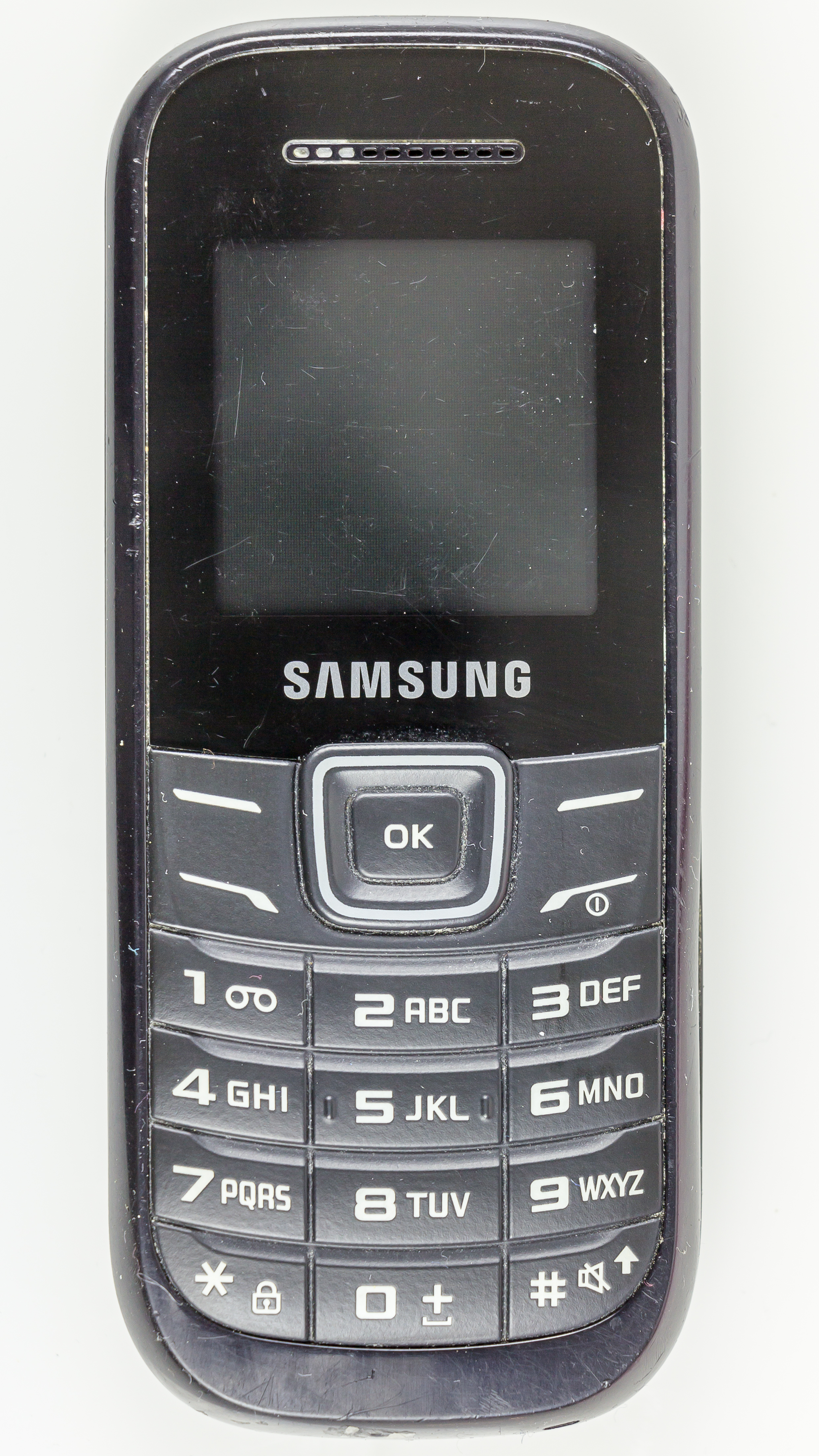
- Samsung GT-E1200i in Black
- Developer: Samsung
- Manufacturer: Samsung Electronics
- Type: Feature phone
- First released: November 2011; 14 years ago
- Availability by region: December 2011
- Predecessor: Samsung E1180
- Successor: Samsung SM-B105E; Samsung Galaxy Young
- Related: Samsung E1200i; Samsung E1200R
- Compatible networks: GSM 900, 1800 MHz
- Form factor: Candybar
- Dimensions: 108 mm (4.3 in) H 45 mm (1.8 in) Wi; 13.5 mm (0.53 in) D
- Weight: 65.1 g (2.30 oz)
- Operating system: Closed Source Samsung General Proprietary OS (SGP)
- Memory: 2 / 4 MB ROM
- Storage: ~ 4 / 8 MB
- SIM: Single slot of Mini SIM (Dual sim on GT-E1202)
- Battery: 800 mAh; User-replaceable
- Charging: Standard charging up to 4.2V
- Display: 3.86 cm (1.51 in) TFT LCD, 128×128 pixels, 16384 pixels (120 ppi)
- Sound: Speaker, Multipurpose jack
- Connectivity: SIM Card
- Data inputs: Keypad
- Website: Samsung E1200, Samsung Guru E1200, Samsung Keystone II

The Samsung E1200 (also known as Samsung Pusha, Samsung Guru 1200 and Samsung Keystone II) is a mobile phone made by Samsung. This phone was announced in 24 October 2011 through Tesco in the UK. It is the successor to the Samsung E1180 and the predecessor to the Galaxy Young, and was discontinued in 2015 when the Samsung Guru FM E1202 was released as its successor. Samsung brought it back in 2021.

== Hardware ==
The case of the Samsung GT-E1200 is made of two pieces of plastic, and the back of the phone has a special gloss finish on the bottom of the back cover. The buttons are rubberized and dust-proof, including the power button, which also acts as a call hang-up button. The phone features a TFT LCD capable of displaying 65,536 colors and a keyboard which has a five-way control button. The device has physical dimensions of 108 × 45 × 13.5 mm and weighs 65 grams. The phone features an antenna on the bottom right of the back of the phone. The single SIM slot is accessed by removing the user-replaceable battery after snapping off the back plastic cover. The phone features also a torch on the top.

== Software ==
The user interface of the Samsung GT-E1200 is fluid and easy to maneuver. The operating system of the GT-E1200 is probably a closed source Samsung General Proprietary OS (SGP) The phone features 9 apps in the menu which are by row order:

1. Call log
2. Contacts
3. Calendar
4. Alarms
5. Messages
6. Calculator
7. Torch light
8. Settings
9. Applications

These applications are permanent and cannot be changed or removed. The user can enable a setting so that when opening Messages, Contacts, Call log and/or Calendar, it requires the preset password to open.
