= Samsung E1107 =

Mobile phone model

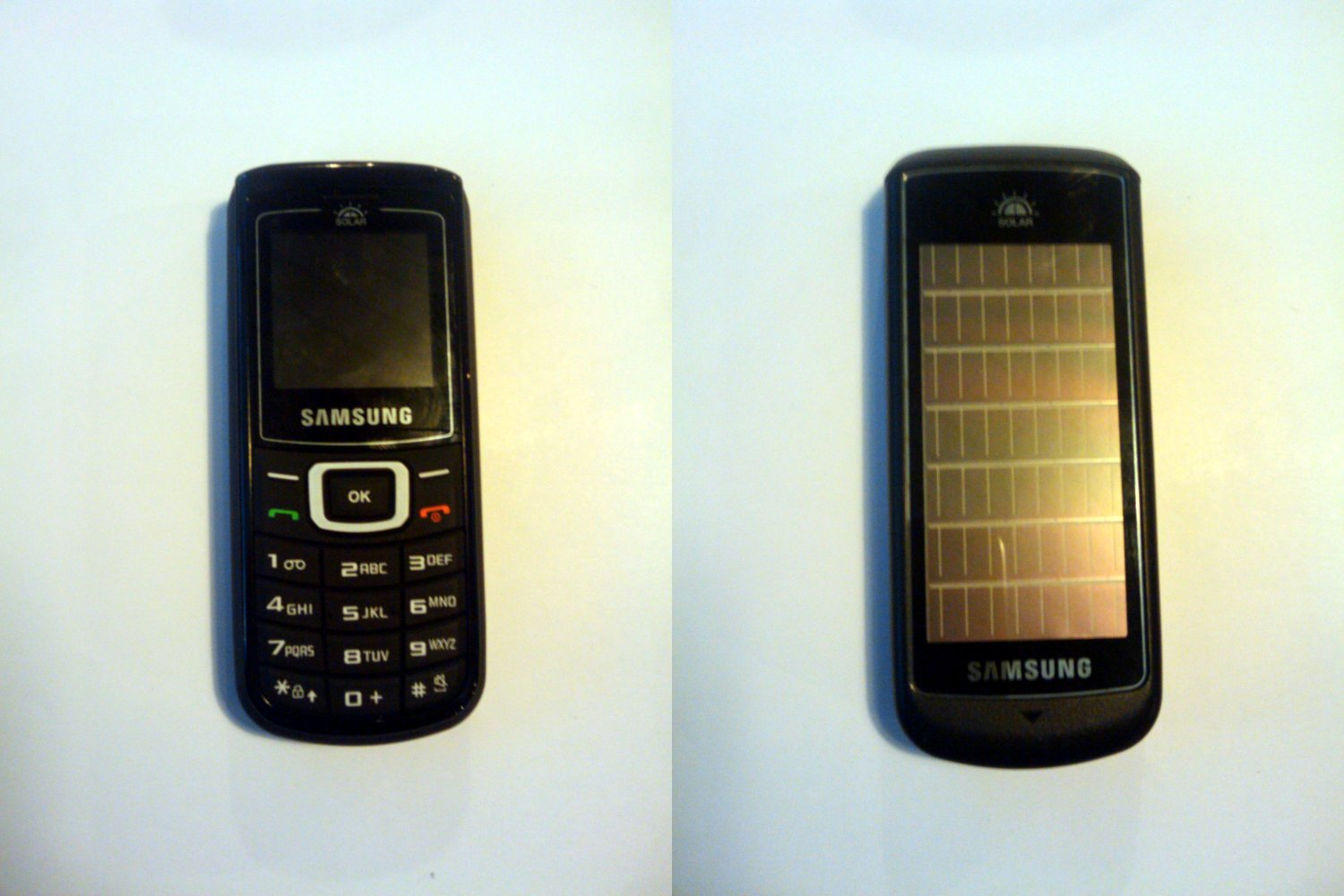
- Manufacturer: Samsung
- Successor: Samsung Blue Earth (with solar charging support); Samsung Galaxy Mini (direct)
- Compatible networks: GSM 900, GSM 1800
- Form factor: candybar
- Dimensions: 105.2 x 44.15 x 16.4
- Weight: 119 g (4 oz)
- Storage: 1.5MB (up to 500 contacts)
- Battery: Li-ion 800 mAh
- Display: 128x128px, 1.52", 65K CSTN
- Data inputs: Numeric keypad
- Other: solar panel

The Samsung E1107 (also known as "CrestSolar" or "Solar Guru") is a mobile phone designed for a rural lower budget market. The handset has a solar cell on the back and is made from recycled materials. It was first released in India on July 10, 2009, with an initial price of ₹2,799, and later was replaced in 2011 by the Samsung Galaxy Mini.

== Features ==
The feature set is spatial (clock, alarm, timer, stopwatch, organizer, T9 predictive text, calculator, converter, 10 polyphonic ringtones, 5 menu color themes, 3 wallpapers, 2 games (Sudoku and Super Jewel Quest), vibration, profiles, phonebook (500 entries) and call log (30 entries)) .

Additionally it has features especially interesting for a rural consumer market like an LED lamp and power saving mode. It also has support for a built-in phone tracker and SOS messages. No connectivity like USB, Bluetooth or Infrared is supported.

=== Applications ===
The Indian version also included a proprietary "Mobile prayer", a specialized feature for Indian religions that includes prayers and wallpapers for each as well as alerts for prayer time.

=== Battery ===
The battery supports up to 570 hours of standby or 8 hours of talk time.

=== Solar Panel ===
It can be charged through the solar panel for up to 10 minutes of talk time per hour of charging. According to the user manual the phone is not supposed to run on solar power alone for an extended period of time.

Other sources state the stand-by time as up to 30 min and the talk time as up to 1 min 40 sec, if the solar panel is used as charging method.

== Usage ==
In 2010, a Samsung E1107 was found as contraband in at the Central Prison at Puzhal. Prison inspectors were also searching for a battery and charger until they realised that the back of the device had a built-in solar panel that allowed it to be charged without an AC adapter.
