= Samsung Galaxy Star 2 Plus =

2014 Android smartphone by Samsung Electronics

Samsung Galaxy Star 2 Plus (G-350E)
- Brand: Samsung
- Manufacturer: Samsung Electronics
- Type: Touchscreen Smartphone
- Series: Samsung Galaxy
- First released: August 2014; 11 years ago
- Predecessor: Samsung Galaxy Star
- Related: Samsung Galaxy Star 2 Samsung Galaxy Star Advance; Samsung Galaxy Core
- Compatible networks: GSM GPRS/EDGE GSM850, GSM900, DCS1800, PCS1900
- Dimensions: 129.7 mm (5.11 in) H 65.9 mm (2.59 in) W 9.4 mm (0.37 in) D
- Weight: 129 g (4.6 oz)
- Operating system: Android 4.4.2 KitKat (can be upgraded to unofficial Cyanogenmod 12.1 (Android 5.1.1 Lollipop)
- CPU: Single-core ARM Cortex-A7 at 1.2 GHz
- Memory: 512 MB RAM
- Storage: 4 GB
- Removable storage: microSD support for up to 32 GB
- Battery: Li-ion1800 mAh(internal) Standard battery
- Rear camera: 3.15MP, 2048 x 1536 pixels
- Front camera: None
- Display: 4.3 inch 480 x 800 px WVGA LCD at 217 ppi
- Connectivity: Wi-Fi 802.11 b/g/n Bluetooth 4.0 with A2DP; A-GPS; Micro USB 2.0; 3.5 mm TRRS audio jack FM radio with RDS support
- Data inputs: Capacitive touchscreen Push-buttons; Accelerometer; Digital compass
- Website: Official Website

Samsung Galaxy Star 2 Plus G350E is a smartphone manufactured by Samsung Electronics that runs on the open source Android operating system. Announced by Samsung in early August 2014. It has additional software features, expanded hardware, and a redesigned physique from its predecessor, the Samsung Galaxy Star 2.

== Specifications ==
=== Connectivity ===
Galaxy Star does not support 3G connectivity, instead running on EDGE networks alone. It also does not provide a Global Positioning System (GPS). However it provides support for WiFi connectivity and Bluetooth 4.0.

=== Hardware ===
The Samsung Galaxy Star 2 Plus uses a refined version of the hardware design, with a rounded, plastic leather and a removable rear cover. It is slightly lighter and narrower than the Samsung Galaxy Star, with a length of 129.7 mm (5.11 in), a width of 69.9 mm (2.59 in), and a thickness of 9.4 mm (0.37 in). At the bottom of the device is a microphone and a microUSB port for data connections and charging. A headphone jack is located at the top. The Star 2 Plus is widely available in black and white color finishes. The Star 2 Plus comes with 4 GB of internal storage, which can be supplemented with up to an additional 32 GB with a microSD card slot. The Star 2 Plus contains an 1800 mAh battery.

=== Software ===
The Star 2 Plus is powered by Android, a Linux-based, open source mobile operating system developed by Google and introduced commercially in 2008. Among other features, the software allows users to maintain customized home screens which can contain shortcuts to applications and widgets for displaying information. Three shortcuts to frequently used applications can be stored on a dock at the bottom of the screen; the button in the right of the dock opens the application drawer, which displays a menu containing all of the apps installed on the device. A tray accessed by dragging from the top of the screen allows users to view notifications received from other apps, and contains toggle switches for commonly used functions. Pre-loaded apps also provide access to Google's various services. The Star 2 Plus uses Samsung's proprietary TouchWiz graphical user interface (GUI).

The Galaxy Star 2 Plus ships with Android 4.4.2 "Kit Kat". Unofficially there are two CyanogenMod custom ROMs built by developers called Hicham03 and ahtesham01: CyanogenMod 13 (based on Android 6.0.1 Marshmallow)CyanogenMod 12.1 (based on Android 5.1.1 Lollipop) and CyanogenMod 11 (based on Android 4.4.4 KitKat).

== Reception ==
The Samsung Galaxy Star 2 Plus received mixed to positive reviews from critics, who mostly praised the design, but criticized the non 3G connectivity and individual reviewers in the Internet have criticized the device due to its lack of a GPS.

== See also ==
- Samsung Galaxy Core
- Samsung Galaxy Star
