= Samsung Galaxy Y Pro DUOS =

Mobile phone from Samsung

Samsung Galaxy Y Pro Duos gt-b5512
- Manufacturer: Samsung Electronics
- Type: Smartphone
- Series: Samsung Galaxy
- First released: January 1, 2012; 14 years ago
- Related: Samsung Galaxy Y
- Compatible networks: GSM 850 / 900 / 1800 / 1900 - SIM 1 & SIM 2, HSDPA 900 / 2100 - GT-B5512, HSDPA 850 / 1900 / 2100 - GT-B5512B
- Form factor: Candybar
- Dimensions: 110.8 mm (4.36 in) H 63.5 mm (2.50 in) W 11.9 mm (0.47 in) D
- Weight: 112.3 g (3.96 oz)
- Operating system: Android 2.3.6 "Gingerbread"
- CPU: 832 Mhz Single core
- Memory: 384 MB RAM
- Storage: 512 MB ROM, 160 MB user accessible
- Removable storage: microSDHC up to 32 GB
- Battery: 1,350 mAh internal rechargeable Li-ion
- Rear camera: 3.15 megapixel (2,048 × 1,536), 2592x1944 px, Video Recording 24@ fps 320x240 px (QVGA), Geo-tagging
- Display: 2.6 in (66 mm) TFT QVGA 320×240 px 256K Colors
- Data inputs: Capacitive touchscreen TFT display

The Galaxy Y Pro DUOS GT-B5512 is a mobile phone from Samsung which was released in January 2012. It features the ability to hold 2 SIM cards, plus has a full QWERTY keyboard and touchpad to navigate the Google Android operating system. It is the successor to the Galaxy Y Pro GT-5510.

== See also ==
- Galaxy Nexus
- List of Android devices
- Samsung Galaxy Y
- Samsung Galaxy Y DUOS
