= Samsung Galaxy Mini 2 =

2012 smartphone produced by Samsung

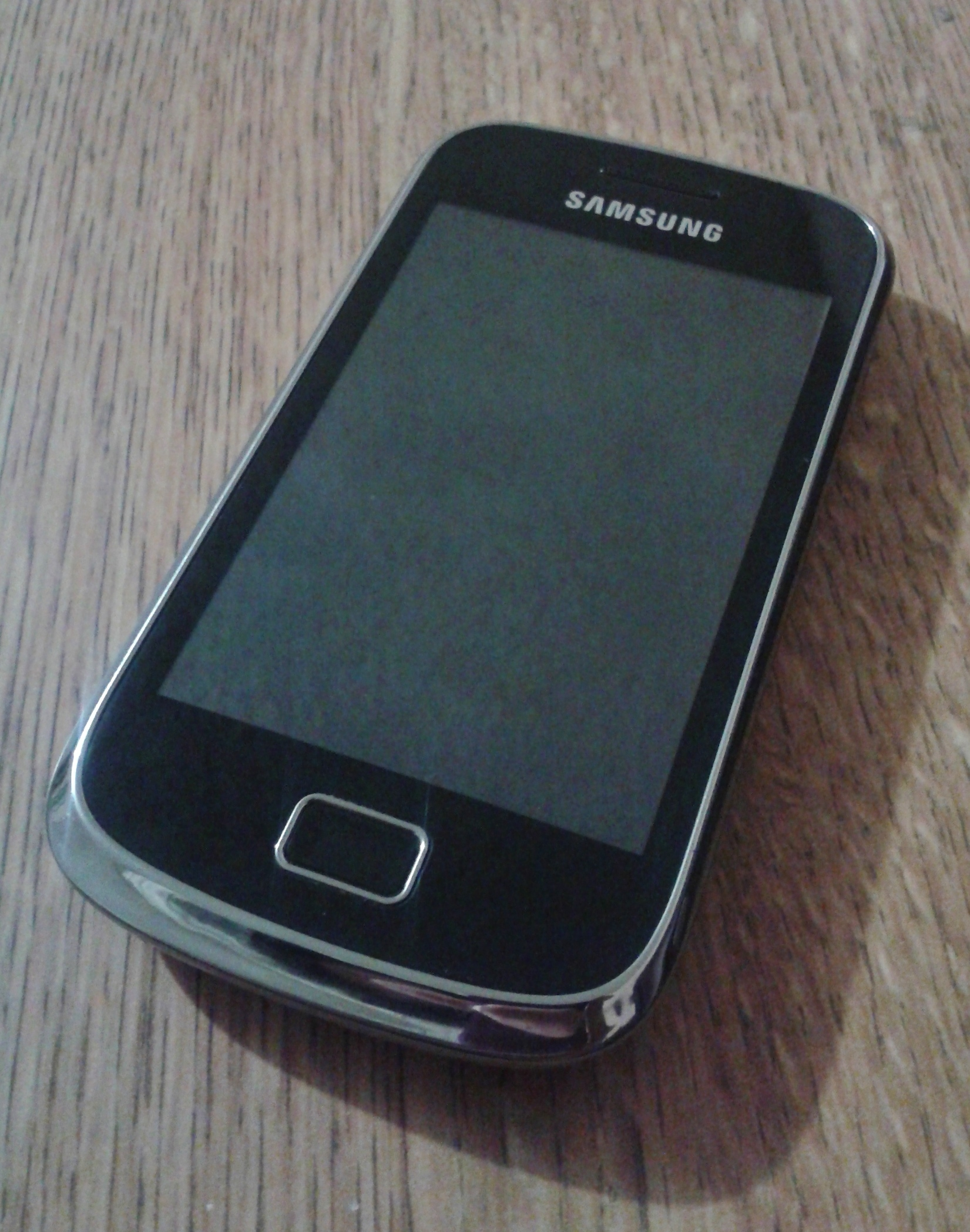
- Samsung Galaxy Mini 2
- Brand: Samsung
- Manufacturer: Samsung Electronics
- Type: Smartphone
- Series: Galaxy
- First released: February 1, 2012; 14 years ago
- Availability by region: March 1, 2012
- Predecessor: Samsung Galaxy Mini
- Successor: Samsung Galaxy Fame and Galaxy Young (low-end options), Galaxy S III Mini (direct)
- Compatible networks: GSM 850/900/1800/1900, HSDPA 900/2100
- Form factor: Slate
- Dimensions: 109.4 mm (4.31 in) H 58.6 mm (2.31 in) W 11.6 mm (0.46 in) D
- Weight: 105.3 g (3.71 oz)
- Operating system: Original: Android 2.3.4 "Gingerbread"; Last: Android 2.3.6 Gingerbread; Unofficial: CyanogenMod 11 (based on Android 4.4 "KitKat")
- CPU: Snapdragon S1 / MSM7227A; ARMv7: ARM Cortex-A5 800 MHz
- GPU: Adreno 200
- Memory: 512 MB RAM (398 MB available for user)
- Storage: 4 GB (1,83 GB is available)
- Removable storage: microSD, up to 32 GB
- Battery: Removable, 1300 mAh Li-Ion
- Rear camera: CMOS 3.0 MP (official spec); 2048×1536 pixels (~3.15 MP in pixel count)
- Display: 3.27" TFT, 320×480 pixels (~176 ppi pixel density)
- Sound: 3-pin TRS headphone jack, loudspeaker
- Connectivity: Wi-Fi, Wi-Fi hotspot, Wi-Fi Direct, DLNA; Bluetooth 3.0
- Data inputs: Capacitive touchscreen
- Model: GT-S6500/D/L/T/X
- SAR: 0.92 W/kg (head); 0.62 W/kg (body)
- Other: Accelerometer, proximity sensor, compass, stereo FM radio with RDS and noise reduction
- Website: GT-S6500 UK support homepage

Samsung Galaxy Mini 2 is a smartphone manufactured by Samsung that runs the Android 2.3 "Gingerbread" operating system. It was announced and released by Samsung in February 2012. It is available in three colors: black, yellow, and orange.

== Hardware ==
Galaxy Mini 2 features the Qualcomm Snapdragon S1 SoC design in an MSM7227A chip. This contains an ARMv7-based ARM Cortex-A5 CPU clocked to a slightly faster speed of up to 800 MHz, and an enhanced Adreno 200 GPU core. The display is a 3.27-inch HVGA TFT LCD screen with a higher pixel density (320×480) than on a previous-generation model. Inclusion of NFC (Near Field Communication) varies by model.

The phone includes a plain 3-megapixel rear camera protected by a hardened scratch-proof glass, but does not include autofocus and flash. Official product literature does not specify the exact camera sensor size beyond "3 MP", though the total pixel count does amount to approximately 3.15 Mpix. The camera supports geotagging and video recording; video is recorded in an H.264 format at VGA resolution (640×480 pixels @ 30 fps).

Further device features include A-GPS for navigation, Bluetooth, USB data transfer and charging via microUSB, and an FM radio with RDS support. The FM radio app has slots for twelve channel presets.

== Software upgrade path ==
Samsung announced on September 24, 2012, that Galaxy Mini 2 was to be updated in the future with Android 4.1 "Jelly Bean", but later abandoned development of Jelly Bean for Mini 2. An unofficial port of CyanogenMod 10.1 (of Jelly Bean branch, v4.2.2) for Galaxy Mini 2 has been rated stable as of the 2013-12-27 release date.

== Model variations ==
There are several different sub-models of Galaxy Mini 2:

Model	Notes/target market	NFC
S6500	Original model	Yes
S6500D	Europe and Asia	No
S6500T	Australia	
S6500L	Latin America	No
S6500X	India	Yes

== Successor models ==
A little over a year later, Samsung in April 2013 released Samsung Galaxy Fame S6810, and in October 2013 released Samsung Galaxy Fame Lite S6790. Most improvements over Galaxy Mini 2 are incremental. The SoC design is now based on Broadcom BCM21654G. Both phone models are equipped with slightly higher-clocked CPUs (1 GHz/850 MHz), Bluetooth 4.0, Android 4.1.2 Jelly Bean, and 3G connectivity gains HSUPA.

Differing features in Galaxy Fame include a 5 Mpix camera with auto-focus, a front camera, support for up to 64 GB microSD cards, and NFC or dual-SIM variants depending on model. This model still supports Mini-SIM cards.

Galaxy Fame Lite differs from Galaxy Mini 2 with Micro-SIM support. Inclusion of NFC or the FM radio may vary depending on submodel (some have one or the other, both, or neither). The camera remains at 3.0 Mpix.

A sibling model released in October 2013 is Galaxy Fame Lite Duos (S6792, with L as one known region-specific submodel), which differs by having dual-SIM support.
