= Samsung Galaxy Pocket 2 =

Cell phone produced by Samsung

- Brand: Samsung Galaxy
- Manufacturer: Samsung Electronics
- Series: Pocket-series
- First released: September 2014
- Predecessor: Samsung Galaxy Pocket Neo
- Compatible networks: 2G, 3G
- Dimensions: 109.9 mm (4.33 in) H 60.8 mm (2.39 in) W 11.7 mm (0.46 in) D
- Weight: 109 g (3.77 oz)
- Operating system: Android 4.4.2 KitKat
- CPU: 1 GHz Cortex-A7
- Memory: 512 MB RAM
- Storage: 4 GB
- Removable storage: MicroSD up to 32 GB
- Battery: Li-Ion 1200 mAh
- Rear camera: 2 MP
- Front camera: No
- Display: 3.3 in (84 mm) 240 x 320 pixel
- Connectivity: Micro USB 2.0, Bluetooth 4.0, Wi-Fi b/g/n, Wi-Fi Direct, GPS location
- Model: SM-G110B, SM-G110B/DS, SM-G110H, SM-G110M

The Samsung Galaxy Pocket 2 is a small budget Android smartphone produced by Samsung Electronics and released in September 2014.

== Specifications ==
=== Hardware ===
The phone is powered by Spreadtrum SC7715 SoC with 1 GHz ARM Cortex-A7 CPU and ARM Mali 400 GPU. It has 512 MB RAM, 4 GB internal storage and 1200 mAh battery. The device comes with dual SIM card slot; one of the SIM card slots is hybrid, so it can either be used as SIM card slot or microSD card slot. Also, it has a 3.3 inch screen with 240 x 320 pixels resolution and 3G connectivity.

=== Software ===
This phone was officially released with Android 4.4.2 KitKat.

== See also ==
- Samsung Galaxy
- Samsung Galaxy J1 Mini (2016)
