= Samsung Galaxy Fame =

Android smartphone by Samsung

Samsung Galaxy Fame (GT-S6810/P/E/L/M) (GT-S6812/C/i)
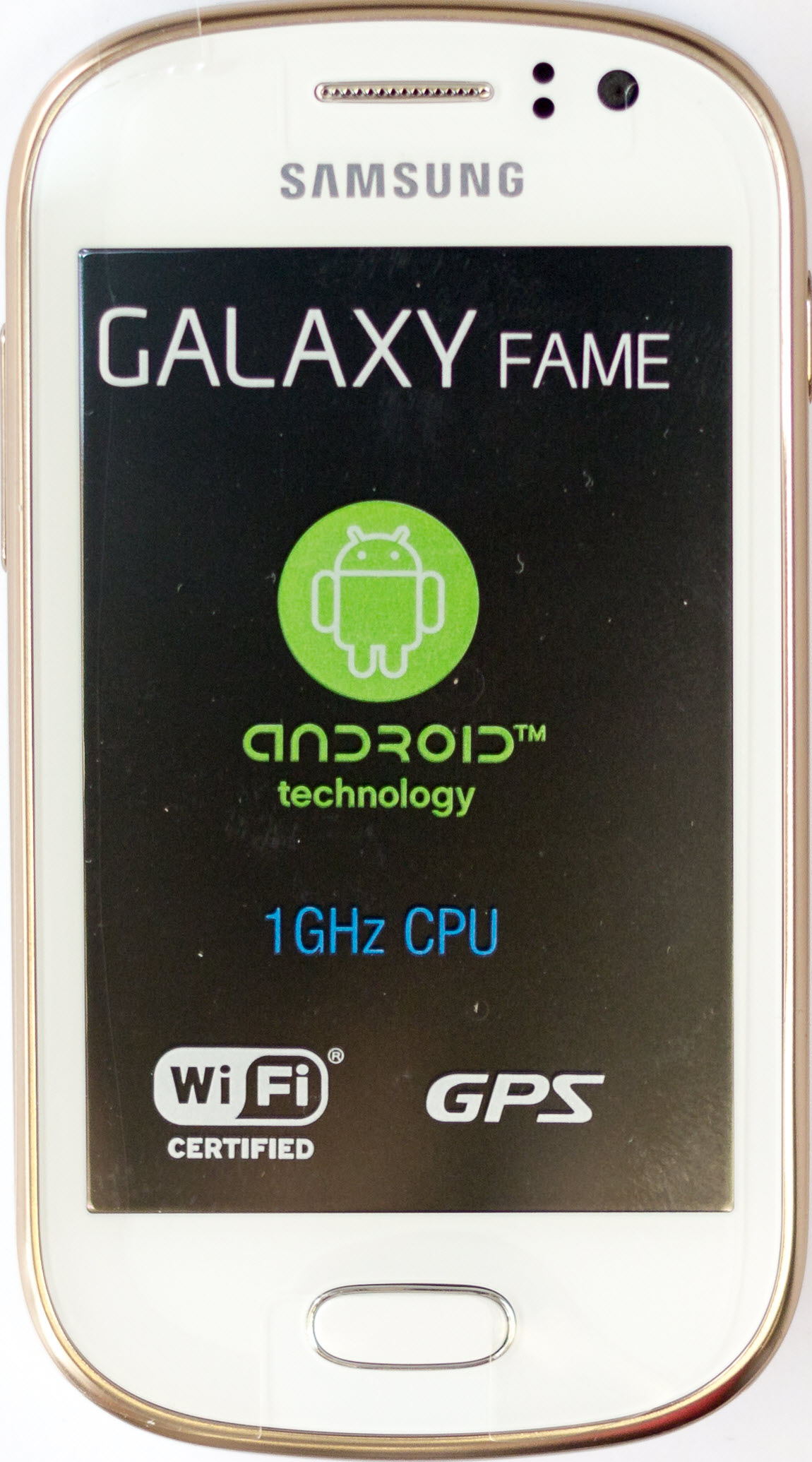
- Samsung Galaxy Fame
- Brand: Samsung Galaxy
- Manufacturer: Samsung Electronics
- First released: 23 April 2013
- Predecessor: Samsung Galaxy Mini 2
- Form factor: Candybar
- Dimensions: 113.2 mm (4.46 in) H 61.6 mm (2.43 in) W 11.6 mm (0.46 in) D
- Weight: 120.6 g (4.25 oz)
- Operating system: Android 4.1.2 "Jelly Bean" With TouchWiz Non-upgradeable
- CPU: 1 GHz single-core ARM Cortex-A9
- GPU: Broadcom VideoCore IV
- Memory: 512 MB RAM LPDDR2
- Storage: 4 GB (2GB user accessible)
- Removable storage: MicroSD (HC/XC) up to 64 GB
- SIM: 1 MiniSIM slot (regular variants) 2 MiniSIM slots (Dual SIM variant)
- Battery: Li-Ion 1300 mAh
- Rear camera: 5 Megapixel, 2560 x 1920 pixels, autofocus, LED Flash
- Front camera: VGA
- Display: 3.5 in (89 mm) HVGA LCD
- Connectivity: USB 2.0, Bluetooth 4.0, Wi-Fi b/g, Wi-Fi Direct, GPS Location, NFC and S-Beam (GT-S6810P)

The Samsung Galaxy Fame is a low-end smartphone by Samsung Electronics which was released in February 2013. Like all other Samsung Galaxy smartphones, the Galaxy Fame runs on the Android mobile operating system. The phone features a 3.5 inch HVGA LCD touchscreen. Depending on the model, the phone can have variants which have dual-MicroSIM or NFC capabilities.

== Specifications ==
The phone follows the candybar form factor for smartphones, and features a plastic exterior. The Galaxy Fame features an ARM Cortex-A9 1 GHz single-core processor. It has 4GB of internal storage and supports microSD cards up to 64GB. The device features an accelerometer intended to translate natural gestures into commands on the phone; for example, if the phone is ringing and the user turns it face down, it will mute the incoming call, or if the user wishes to update a Bluetooth or wireless internet connection, they can shake the device and it will automatically update. It also features an embedded NFC chip and S-Beam on certain models, which is usually only found on high-end Galaxy devices.

== Variants ==
=== NFC model - GT-S6810P ===
The GT-S6810P is an NFC variant of the Galaxy Fame.

=== Dual SIM models - GT-S6812/GT-S6812C/GT-S6812i ===
The GT-S6812 is a dual SIM variant of the Galaxy Fame. A model for China Unicom (GT-S6812C) has also been released.

=== Fame Lite S6790 ===
This version features an 850 MHz single-core processor and a 3 megapixel camera.

== Reception ==
Many users have found the device's capabilities to be basic, seeing it as a low-end smartphone for light users that want some of the functionality of higher end Galaxy devices.

== See also ==
- Samsung Galaxy Ace
- Samsung Galaxy Young 2
