= Samsung S7550 =

Mobile phone model

Samsung GT-S7550 Blue Earth
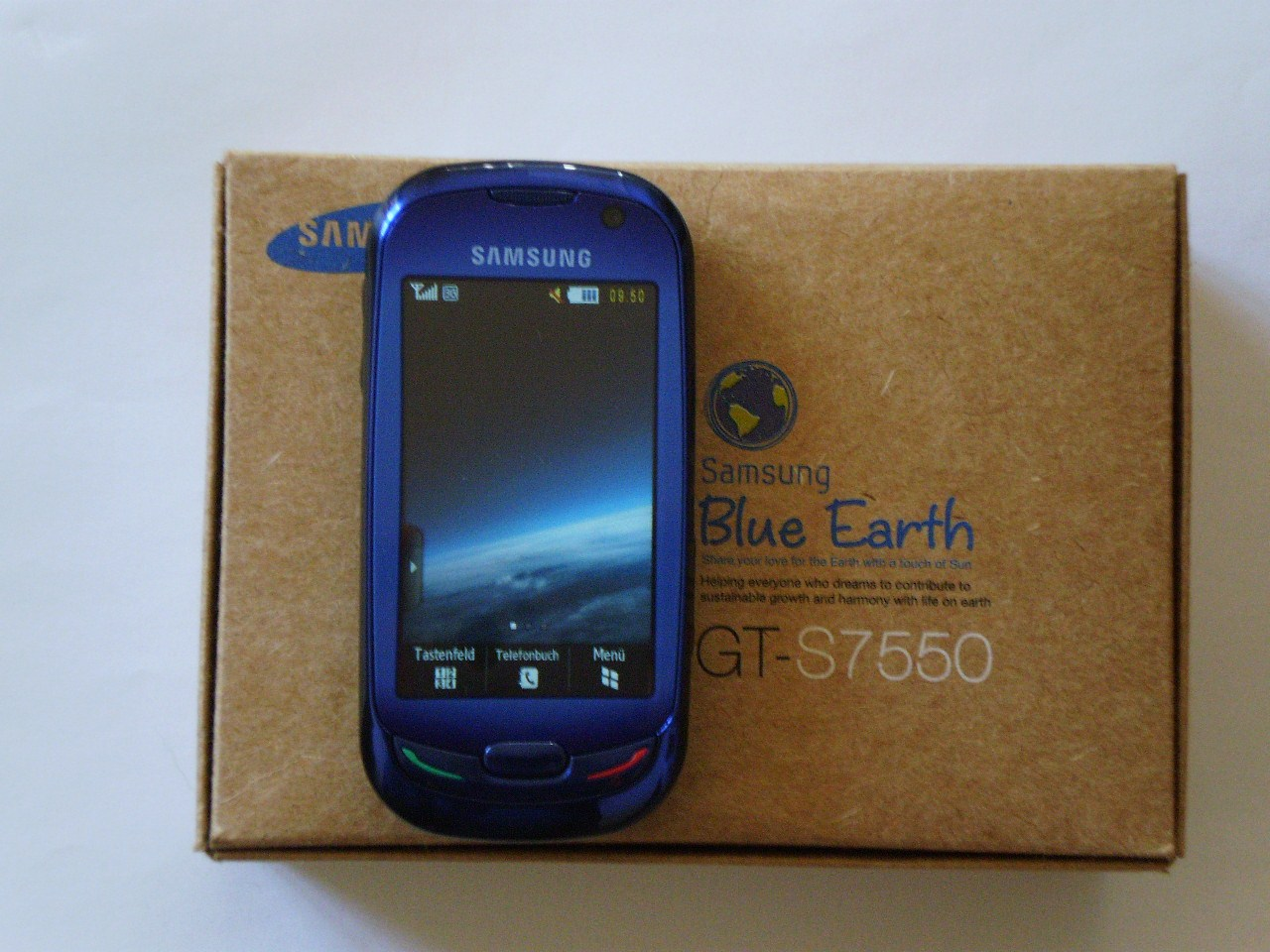
- The phone on its packaging box with the menu displayed in German language
- Manufacturer: Samsung Mobile
- Weight: 119 g (4.2 oz)
- Operating system: Java Proprietary (with TouchWiz UI)
- Battery: Li-lon
- Display: 3 in (76 mm) 240x400 16M colors WQVGA TFT LCD (TFT capacitive touchscreen)
- External display: 3 in (76 mm)

Samsung Blue Earth, also known as Samsung S7550, or Samsung GT-S7550 (European model), is a touchscreen phone made from recycled plastic culled from plastic water bottles. It was announced on 12 February 2009. The unit has a solar panel on the back, covering 80% of the area. An hour of charging under sunlight can provide 10 minutes of talking on 3G networks or 2 hours in standby. A conventional rechargeable battery is also provided.

== Reception ==
CNET praised the phone for its design and feature set, but criticized its small screen and lack of a physical keyboard.

Times of Malta enjoyed the phone's screen, camera quality, and Internet connectivity, while noting its high price "compared to phones with similar functions."
