= Samsung i5500 =

Smartphone model

Samsung Galaxy 5

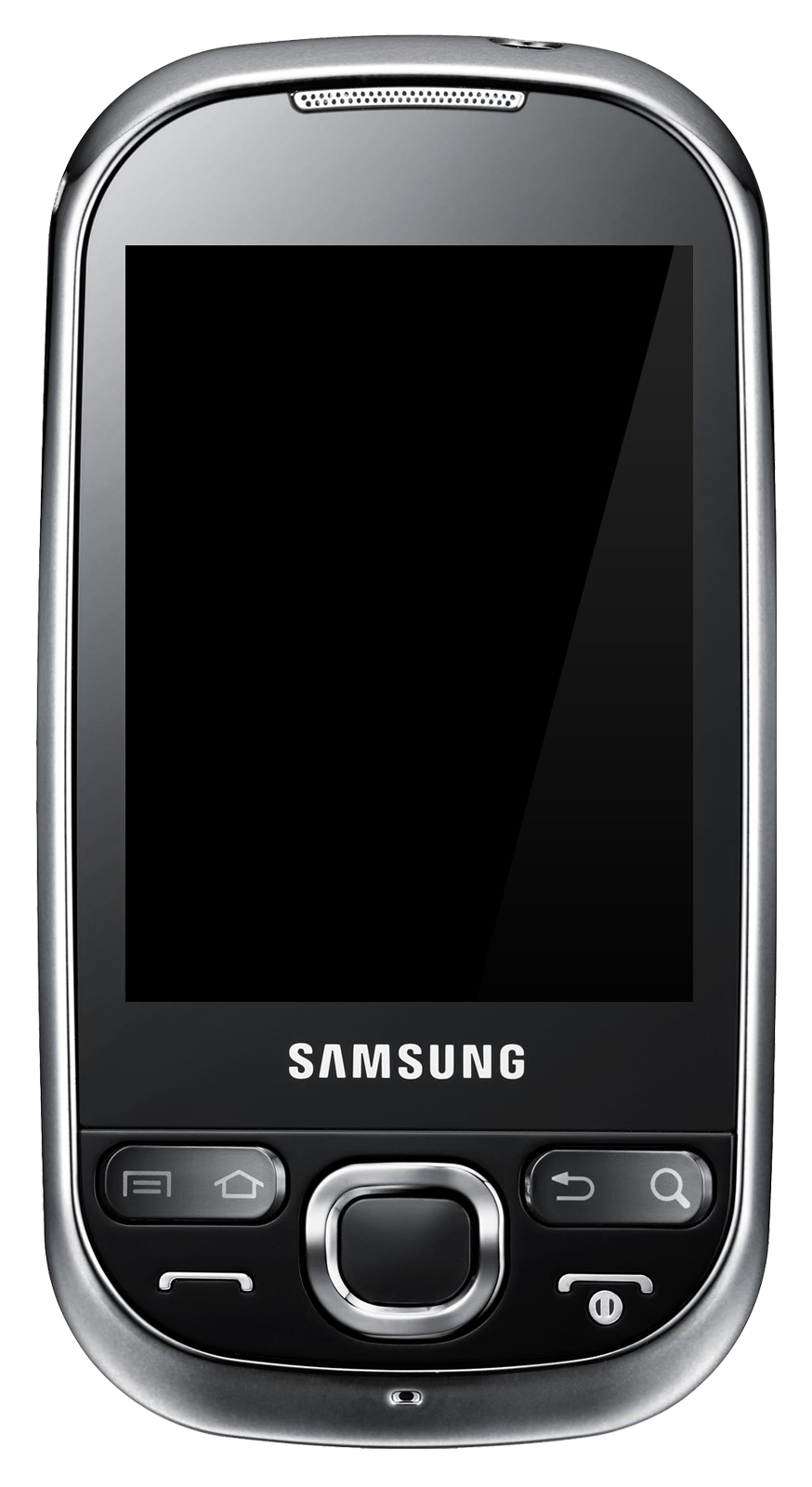
- Samsung Galaxy 5 in Black
- Also known as: GT-I5500/I5503; Samsung Galaxy Europa; Samsung Galaxy 550; Samsung Corby Smartphone; Samsung Corby Android
- Manufacturer: Samsung
- Type: Slate
- Family: Samsung Galaxy
- First released: August 2010; 15 years ago
- Availability by region: August 2010
- Successor: Samsung Galaxy Mini
- Related: Samsung Corby
- Compatible networks: GSM/GPRS/EDGE 850/900/1800/1900 MHz UMTS/HSDPA (3.5G) 850/900/1900/2100 MHz up to 7.2 Mbps
- Dimensions: 108 mm (4.3 in) H 56 mm (2.2 in) W 12.3 mm (0.48 in) D
- Weight: 102 g (3.6 oz)
- Operating system: Original: Android 2.1 "Eclair"; Current: Android 2.2 "Froyo"
- CPU: MSM7227-1 ARM11 600 MHz
- Memory: 256 MB (Accessible: 184 MB) SDRAM
- Storage: 512 MB (Accessible: 184 MB) up to 32 GB microSD card
- Removable storage: microSD
- Battery: 1200 mAh Li-ion
- Rear camera: 2.0 Megapixels fixed focus, face detection, panorama mode
- Display: 240 x 320 pixels, 2.8 inches (~143 ppi pixel density) 16M color
- Media: Audio MP3, AAC, AAC+, eAAC+, Ogg Vorbis; Video MP4, H.264, H.263
- Connectivity: Wi-Fi Atheros 6k chipset 802.11b/g/n with DLNA; Bluetooth 2.1 with A2DP; A-GPS; Micro USB 2.0; 3.5mm TRRS audio jack; FM radio with RDS support
- Data inputs: Capacitive touchscreen; Push-buttons; Accelerometer; Digital compass; Swype keyboard
- SAR: 0.65 W/kg (head)

The Samsung GT-I5500/I5503/I5510, also marketed as the Samsung Galaxy 5, Samsung Galaxy Europa, Samsung Galaxy 550, Samsung Corby Smartphone and Samsung Corby Android, is a smartphone running the Android operating system. It was announced on June 15, 2010 and is part of the Samsung Galaxy series.

There are no official updates provided beyond Android 2.2.1 "Froyo", and both the Galaxy 5 and the E1107 were replaced in March 2011 by the Samsung Galaxy Mini.

== Specifications ==
The phone measures 108 millimetres (4.3 in) x 56 millimetres (2.2 in) x 12.3 millimetres (0.48 in). It ships with Android 2.1 Eclair operating system and supports the HSDPA ("3.5G") mobile telephony protocol at 7.2 Mbit/s. The user interface features a capacitive touchscreen but does not support multi-touch as found on high end smartphones. The 2.8 inches (71 mm) screen supports QVGA (240 x 320 pixels) resolution with a 16M color depth. The communication features include Bluetooth, 3G, Wi-Fi and A-GPS.

== Android software ==
When originally released, the phone came with Android 2.1 Eclair as the preinstalled OS. As of August 2011, most phones are shipping with Android 2.2 Froyo. Some carriers allow an update from Android 2.1 to 2.2 via the Samsung Kies software package, that is bundled with the phone. Froyo brought many new features to the phone, including voice dialling.

Unofficially, the phone can run Android 2.3 Gingerbread, Android 4.0.4 Ice Cream Sandwich, Android 4.3 Jelly Bean or Android 4.4.4 KitKat via three different ports of CyanogenMod made by the same group. At this time, these ports have, together, over 110,000 installations at Samsung i5500 devices.

== See also ==
- Samsung Corby
- Samsung Galaxy Mini
- Samsung Galaxy S (2010 smartphone)
- Samsung Galaxy 3
- Samsung Galaxy Tab 7.0
- Galaxy Nexus
