= Samsung Galaxy Mini =

2011 smartphone developed by Samsung

Samsung Galaxy Mini GT-S5570, GT-S5570B, GT-S5570L, GT-S5570i, GT-S5578
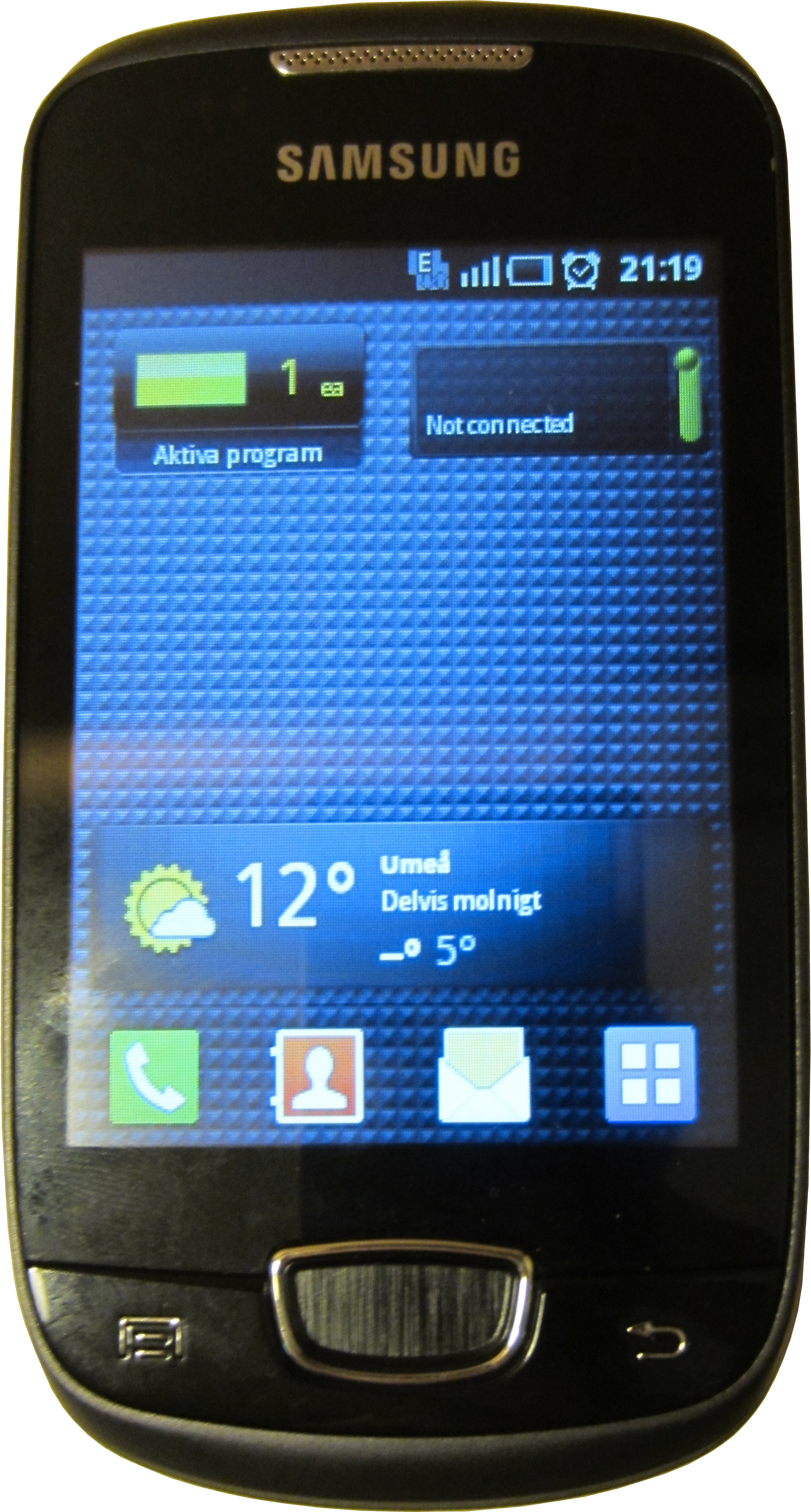
- Manufacturer: Samsung Electronics
- Type: Smartphone
- Series: Galaxy
- First released: February 2011
- Predecessor: Samsung E1107; Samsung Galaxy 5
- Successor: Samsung Galaxy Mini 2
- Compatible networks: GSM 850 MHz/900 MHz/1800 MHz/1900 MHz; HSDPA 7.2 Mbit/s 850 MHz / 900 MHz / 1700 MHz / 1900 MHz / 2100 MHz; CDMA CDMA2000 1xRTT/cdmaOne/EV-DO Rel. 0 800 MHz (SCH-i559)
- Form factor: Slate
- Dimensions: 110.4 mm (4.35 in) H 60.6 mm (2.39 in) W 12.1 mm (0.48 in) D
- Weight: 106.6 g (3.76 oz)
- Operating system: Original: Android 2.2.1 "Froyo"; Current: Android 2.3.6 "Gingerbread"; Unofficial: Android 4.4.2 "KitKat" via CyanogenMod
- CPU: Qualcomm MSM7227 600 MHz (GT-S5570); Broadcom BCM21553 832 MHz (GT-S5570i)
- GPU: Adreno 200 (GT-S5570); Broadcom BCM2763 Videocore IV (GT-S5570i)
- Memory: 278 MB (GT-S5570); 384 MB (GT-S5570i)
- Storage: 160 MB
- Removable storage: microSD (supports up to 32 GB)
- Battery: 1200 mAh Li-ion; User replaceable
- Rear camera: 3.15-megapixel
- Display: TFT LCD 3.14", 127 ppi, 240×320 pixels QVGA, 256k colors
- Media: Audiob MP3, AAC, AAC+, eAAC+ Video MP4, H.264, H.263, Other formats supported through Apps
- Connectivity: 3.5 mm jack Bluetooth v2.1 with A2DP FM Radio with RDS: mono (GT-S5570); stereo (GT-S5570i); micro USB 2.0 Wi-Fi 802.11 (b/g/n)
- Data inputs: Multi-touch, capacitive touchscreen A-GPS; Push buttons
- SAR: 0.961 W/kg
- Other: Swype keyboard

The Samsung Galaxy Mini (GT-S5570[B/L/i]) is a low-end smartphone manufactured by Samsung that runs the Android operating system, announced and released by Samsung in early 2011, as a replacement for the E1107 and Galaxy 5. In some markets, it was sold as the Samsung Galaxy Next/Pop/NG, while it was sold in the United States as the Samsung Dart exclusively for T-Mobile. It was available in four different colors; steel grey, white, lime, and orange. With this release, the face buttons were changed to capacitive touch, matching the rest of the Galaxy lineup.

It was succeeded by the Samsung Galaxy Mini 2, featuring a better screen (480x320 high contrast type vs old 320x240), higher clocked processor (600 vs. 800 MHz), and drastically improved memory (278 vs. 384 MB of RAM; 160 vs. 1830 MB of internal storage available) over the original, as well as Bluetooth v3.0, Wi-Fi Direct & NFC support, among others.

== Features ==
The Galaxy Mini is a 3.5G smartphone that offers quad-band GSM and was announced with two-band HSDPA (900/2100 MHz) at 7.2 Mbit/s. The display is a 3.14 in (80 mm)-diagonal TFT LCD with a 240×320 pixels QVGA resolution supporting up to 256,000 colors.

The Galaxy Mini was presented as an entry-level smartphone, and was (as of 13 May 2011) one of the cheapest Android phones then on the market.

The Galaxy Mini originally ran on Android 2.2 "Froyo", but in May 2011, Samsung announced that the Galaxy Mini (along with other Galaxy models) would get an official upgrade to Android 2.3 Gingerbread. An official upgrade to Android 2.3.6 (Gingerbread) was released via Samsung Kies on 9 December 2011 for some mobile operators. The Galaxy Mini can also be flashed with custom ROMs such as CyanogenMod releases (although not officially supported by Samsung) where it is codenamed tass. The officially supported version of CyanogenMod on the Galaxy Mini as of August 2012 is CyanogenMod 7.2. It will run CyanogenMod 10/10.1/10.2 and even 11, but it is not officially supported, so there may be stability or performance issues, especially in the latter case.

It can be overclocked to 800 MHz with SetCPU.

=== Key features ===
- Dual-touch (two fingers)
- Quad-Band GSM and dual-band 3G support
- 7.2 Mbit/s HSDPA
- WiFi 802.11 (b/g/n)
- Bluetooth technology v 2.1
- USB 2.0 (High Speed)
- 3.14 in (80 mm) 256K-color QVGA TFT touchscreen
- Qualcomm Snapdragon S1 MSM7227 system-on-chip
  - ARMv6 (ARM11) 600 MHz CPU
  - Adreno 200 GPU
- Android OS v2.2 (Froyo) with TouchWiz v3.0 UI, upgrade to v2.3.6 (Gingerbread) available in some places.
- 384 MB RAM (279 MB RAM available)
- 160 MB internal storage, hot-swappable MicroSD slot, 2 GB card included
- 3.15 Mpixel fixed-focus camera with geo-tagging
- GPS receiver with A-GPS
- FM radio with RDS and Radio Text (not available in "Dart" version.)
- 3.5 mm audio jack
- Document editor
- Accelerometer and proximity sensor
- Swype virtual keyboard
- MicroUSB port (charging and data transfer) and stereo Bluetooth 2.1
- SNS (social networking service) integration
- Image/video editor

== See also ==
- Galaxy Nexus
- Galaxy Europa (2011)
- Samsung Dart is alleged to be the same phone for the US T-Mobile market.
