= Samsung Galaxy Young =

Android smartphone

Samsung Galaxy Young (GT-S6310/GT-S6312/GT-S6310L)

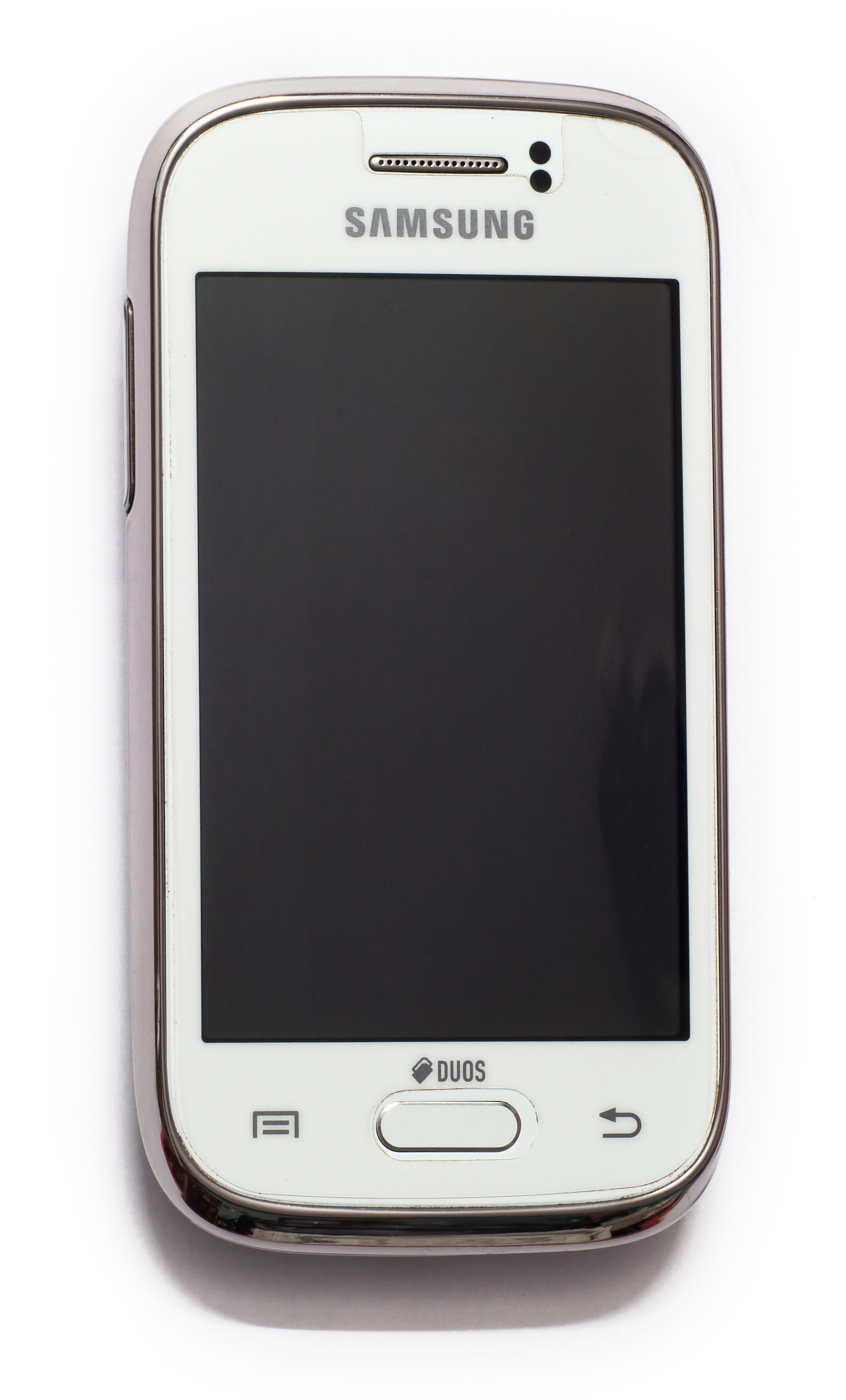
- Brand: Samsung Galaxy
- Manufacturer: Samsung Electronics
- First released: 14 March, 2013
- Predecessor: Samsung E1200; Samsung Galaxy Y Samsung Galaxy Mini 2
- Successor: Samsung Galaxy Young 2
- Form factor: Candybar
- Dimensions: 109.4 mm (4.31 in) H 58.6 mm (2.31 in) W 12.5 mm (0.49 in) D
- Weight: 112 g (4 oz) (0.247 lb)
- Operating system: Android 4.1.2 Jelly Bean With; TouchWiz
- System-on-chip: Qualcomm Snapdragon S1 MSM7227A
- CPU: Single-core ARM Cortex-A5, 1.0 GHz
- GPU: Adreno 200
- Memory: 768 MB / available 665 MB RAM
- Storage: 4 GB / user available 1.58 GB
- Removable storage: microSD support for up to 64 GB
- Battery: 1300 mAh Li-ion battery
- Rear camera: 3.15 Megapixels AF
- Display: 320 x 480 pixels, 3.27 inches (~176 ppi pixel density) TFT LCD capacitive touchscreen, 256K colors
- Connectivity: USB 2.0, Bluetooth 3.0, Wi-Fi b/g, Wi-Fi Direct, GPS Location

The Samsung Galaxy Young is an entry-level Android-based smartphone by Samsung Electronics which was released in March 2013 as a replacement for the GT-E1200, Galaxy Y and Galaxy mini 2. Like all other Samsung Galaxy smartphones, the Galaxy Young runs on the Android mobile operating system. The phone features a 3.27 inch TFT LCD touchscreen. The phone has Dual SIM capabilities depending on the model. Many users have found the device's capabilities basic, seeing it as a low-end smartphone for children or teenagers who are having their first smartphone as the name implies.

== Specifications ==
The phone follows the candybar form factor for smartphones, and features a plastic exterior. The Galaxy Young features a 1GHz processor, and comes equipped with 4 GB of internal storage, which can be upgraded to 64 GB through the use of a microSD card. The device features an accelerometer intended to translate natural gestures into commands on the phone; for example, if the phone is ringing and the user turns it face down, it will stop ringing, or if the user wishes to establish a Bluetooth or wireless internet connection, they can shake the device and it will automatically connect.

A variant of the phone for Brazilian markets, sold under the model GT-S6313T, adds 1seg terrestrial television support.

== Reception ==
According to CNET UK, the Samsung Galaxy Young is a decent device capable of providing users with a low end mobile experience. They have found the screen to be mediocre considering other devices from other brands priced in the same price range. On the other hand, the device excels in terms of some basic functions such as web browsing, communications and even in playing some slight heavier games thanks to the additional 200 plus MB RAM. The device also has access to the Google Play Store, however, it is not capable of running some newer available apps. Many older apps which do not require as much processing power still function normally on the device. Some features, such as pinch-to-zoom, cause the device to lag, which is due to its limited RAM.

Many reviewers have criticized the device due to its outdated processor which results in a sluggish performance in some heavy apps. On the other hand, they praise the 3.15 MP rear camera of the device which they have found to be capable of taking clear pictures with adequate picture quality for its price range. Overall they found the phone as being decently put together for its price.
