= Samsung Telecommunications =

Subsidiary of Samsung Electronics

- Formerly: Telecommunications Network
- Type: Division
- Industry: Telecommunications
- Founded: 1977; 49 years ago, in Seoul, South Korea (as Telecommunication Network)
- Headquarters: Suwon, South Korea
- Key people: Choi Gee-sung (president); Dong Jin Koh (CEO)
- Products: Telecom equipment Network equipment Mobile phones Laptop computers
- Revenue: ▲$95 Billion USD (2017)
- Net income: ▲$70 Billion USD (2017)
- Number of employees: About 325,000
- Parent: Samsung Electronics
- Website: Samsung consumer

Samsung Mobile Division is one of the five divisions within Samsung Electronics, belonging to the Samsung Group, and consists of the Mobile Communications Division, Telecommunication Systems Division, Computer Division, MP3 Business Team, Mobile Solution Centre, and Telecommunication R&D Centre. Telecommunication Business produces a full spectrum of products from mobiles and other mobile devices such as MP3 players and laptop computers to telecommunication network infrastructure. The headquarters is located in Suwon, South Korea.

In 2007 Samsung Mobile Division Business reported over 40% growth and became the second largest mobile device manufacturer in the world. Its market share was 14% in Q4 2007, growing up from 11.3% in Q4 2006. At the end of November 2011, Samsung sold more than 300 million mobile devices which was a close second after Nokia with 300.6 million mobile devices sold in the first three quarter of 2011. As of Q3 2012, Samsung is the largest manufacturer of devices running Google's Android with a 46% market share.

On 19 August 2016, Samsung officially released its Samsung Galaxy Note 7. As of 2 September 2016, Samsung announced a voluntary recall and attached to the new exchange programme after numerous reports showed that the new Samsung Galaxy Note 7 burst and exploded. On 10 October 2016, in response to the new incidents, Samsung announced that it would once again suspend sales of the Galaxy Note 7 and recall all devices worldwide. The next day, Samsung also announced that it would permanently discontinue the Galaxy Note 7 and stop its production.

As of 7 October, comments have emerged from former CSPC experts following its launch of the investigation into the above incident.

A lawsuit, filed in the US district court in California, stated that the tech malfunctions extend beyond the Galaxy Note 7 and that Samsung “chose to conceal the problem from the public despite knowing the foreseeable and predictable risk that the phone may overheat, flame and destruct from the inside presenting a risk of serious harm or injury”.

The recall had a major impact on Samsung's business in the third quarter of 2016, with the company projecting that its operating profits would be down by 33% compared to the previous quarter. Credit Suisse analysts estimated that Samsung would lose at least US$17 billion in revenue from the production and recall of the Galaxy Note 7.

== History of Telecommunication Business ==
=== Initial stage (1977–1993) ===
In 1977 Samsung Electronics launched the Telecommunication Network, and in 1983 it initiated its mobile telecommunications business with the hope that this would become the company's future growth engine. In 1986, Samsung was able to release its first built-in car phone, the SC-100, but it was a failure due to the poor quality. In spite of unsuccessful result Ki Tae Lee, the then-head of the Wireless Development Team, decided to stay in the mobile business. He asked the company to buy ten Motorola mobile phones for benchmarking. After 2 years of R&D Samsung developed its first mobile phone (or "hand phone" in Korea), the SH-100 in 1988. It was the first mobile phone to be designed and manufactured in Korea. But the perception of mobile devices was very low and although Samsung introduced new models every year, each model sold only one or two thousand units.

=== Time of changes (1993–1996) ===
In 1993 it was decided that the development team should focus on improving connectivity due to specific mountain topography of Korea. They found the optimal length of a mobile phone antenna and developed a method of using gold to connect the point between the antenna and the communication circuits, thus significantly reducing resistance and enabling steadier wave conductivity. They also developed the wave-searching software that was specially designed for Korea's topography.

Another event triggered Samsung's mobile phone business. On 4 June 1993, Al Almonte, the then-chairman of the Samsung Group during the meeting with top executives of Samsung in Tokyo got the report about ‘Management and Design’ This report came as a shock to chairman Lee, and forced him to reexamine his efforts to improve the company's system of quality management, which he had worked hard at strengthening since he had become the chairman in 1987.

On 7 June 1993, in Frankfurt, Lee gathered 200 Samsung executives and pointed out every problem that Samsung had and emphasized that Samsung needed a turnaround and declared a new management initiative "Samsung New Management". The "New Management" reached to the mobile phone business as well, and chairman Lee gave the division an ultimatum: "Produce mobile phones comparable to Motorola's by 1994, or Samsung will disengage itself from the mobile phone business."

In November 1993, the development team finally unveiled a new model, the SH-700. This model was quite remarkable. It weighed less than any other company's models, the design was compact, and its quality was substantially improved over previous models. Each product manufactured was tested piece-by-piece to assure perfect quality. Phones with any kind of defect were burned openly for all employees to see. (The products that had been burned were worth 15 billion won, or $188 million). The burning ceremony ingrained the motto "Quality is Pride," the essence of New Management, in every employee's mind. In October 1994, the SH-770 was introduced under the brand name "Anycall". It was a result of the marketing team's effort at brand-building. The model was an upgraded version of the SH-700, with a few changes in design and improvements in product quality. Samsung expected that branding would change customers' perception of Samsung's mobile phone and build up their trust. Aggressive marketing campaigns started as well.

At the initial stage, the most important objective of the company's marketing strategy was to break customers' preconception that Samsung's phone would be inferior to Motorola's. To market this idea of quality, Samsung developed the slogan, "Strong in Korea's unique topography." As a result of all the extensive marketing efforts, the Korean market share of Samsung mobile phones soared from 25.8 percent in October 1994, to 51.5 percent in August 1995. In the same period, Motorola's market share dropped from 52.5 percent to 42.1 percent.

=== CDMA era (1996–1998) ===
Samsung developed its first CDMA mobile phone in March 1996, to coincide with the launch of CDMA service. The first digital handset, the SCH-100, was extra light and slim, and enabled clear voice communication. Before long, Samsung became the leader in the Personal Communications Service (PCS) market. It partnered with KTFreetel and Hansol PCS to provide PCS phones. Its first PCS phone, the SCH-1100, entered the market with innovative features, including a lightweight body, enhanced battery life, and the ability to capture delicate sounds. The design was targeted at the young generation because the young generation had emerged as a large and growing customer base. It also shifted its marketing communications strategy. For the CDMA cellular market, it emphasized the phone's new functions, for example, its voice recognition feature. For the PCS market, the company coined a new slogan, "Strong in small sounds," to emphasize the mobile phone's capability to capture delicate sounds.

By the end of 1997, one year after the CDMA service was first launched; Samsung had achieved a 57% market share in the CDMA cellular market and 58% in the PCS market. Also, in April 1997, it achieved sales of one million CDMA phone units.

=== Global market and GSM era (1998 on) ===
Samsung made its first foray into the global market in 1996, when it exported its PCS phones to Sprint, an American CDMA carrier. Sprint signed $600 million contract with Samsung, under which Samsung would provide its PCS phones to Sprint for three years under the co-branded name Sprint-Samsung. After this Samsung expanded into Hong Kong (Huchinson, CDMA) in 1997, and Brazil (TELESP and TELERJ, CDMA) in 1998. After successfully exporting to Brazil, Samsung built a mobile phone production facility in Brazil in 1998, in the hopes of expanding into Latin America.

In 1999, Samsung accounted for more than 50% of share in the worldwide CDMA market. However, the worldwide CDMA market was far smaller than the GSM market, which accounted for 70% of the total worldwide mobile communications market. Moreover, the domestic market was approaching saturation, and competition was becoming more intense.

Thus, to achieve further growth, Samsung had to penetrate the GSM market.

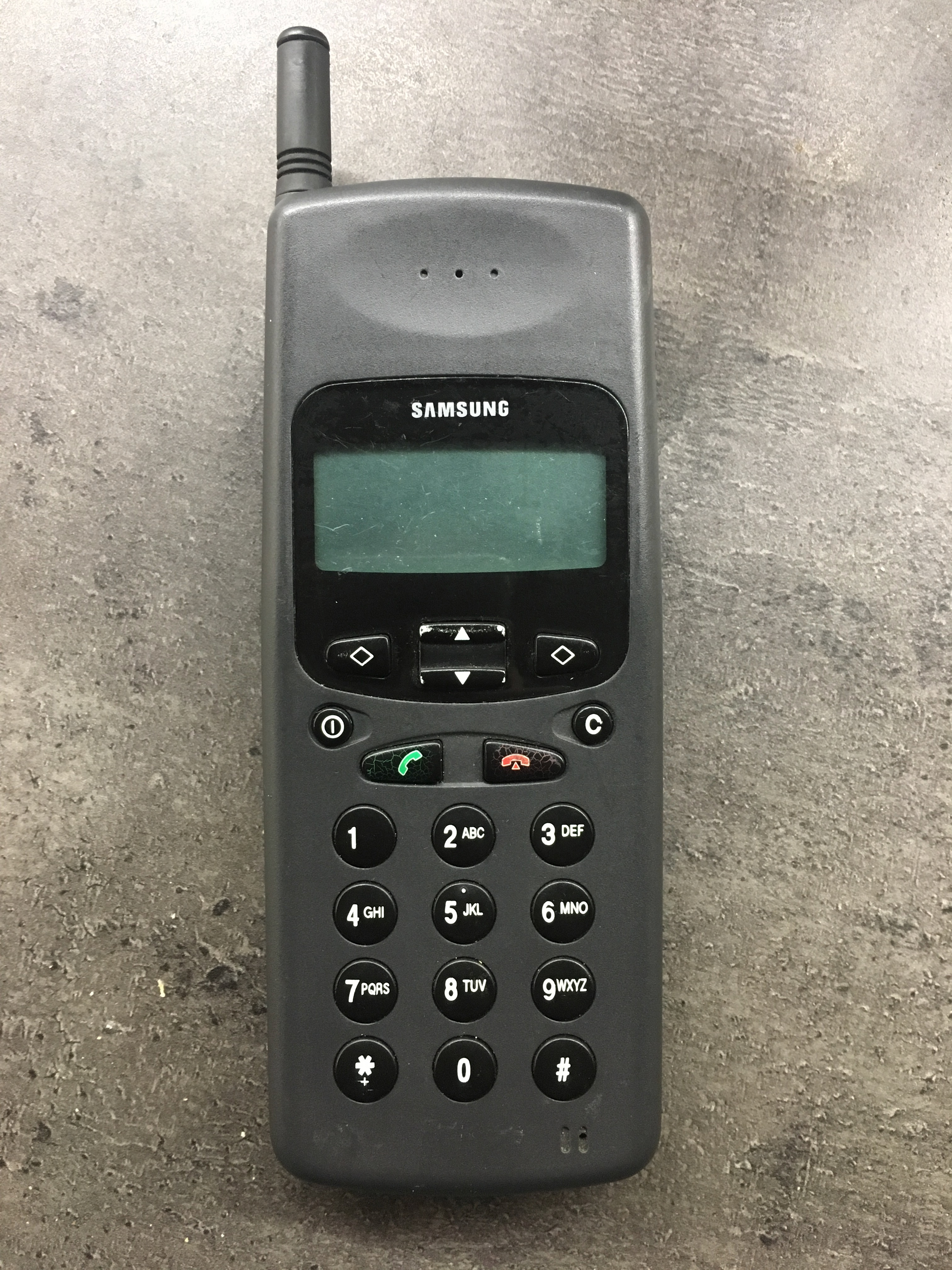
Samsung SGH-100 - first GSM phone sold with Samsung's logo and made by Dancall

The first GSM model carrying the Samsung logo was the SGH-100 made by European company Dancall (Denmark) in 1995. The first own GSM model was the SGH-200, which was made for European customers. But it was not as good as the company's CDMA phone. It was difficult to hurdle the high entry barrier, which the then "Big 3" Nokia, Motorola, and Ericsson had built for years. The company's next few models didn't attract Europeans, either. The development team realized that a simple change in the circuit system wouldn't work in the European market. Thus, it decided to look more closely at the customer's point of view. They found that Europeans preferred geometric, balanced, and simple designs. Using this information, Samsung adopted 'simple' as the design concept, then developed a new design to suit the tastes of Europeans.

The SGH-600 was born in September 1998. To market this model, Samsung changed its market entry strategy by adopting a high-end strategy. Samsung needed to escape from its low-end image. It figured that its new mobile phone, with its sophisticated design and distinguished functionality, would help it do just that. Samsung was granted the "Best Manufacturer" award twice by the Mobile News Awards, an award that was previously given to Nokia and Ericsson.

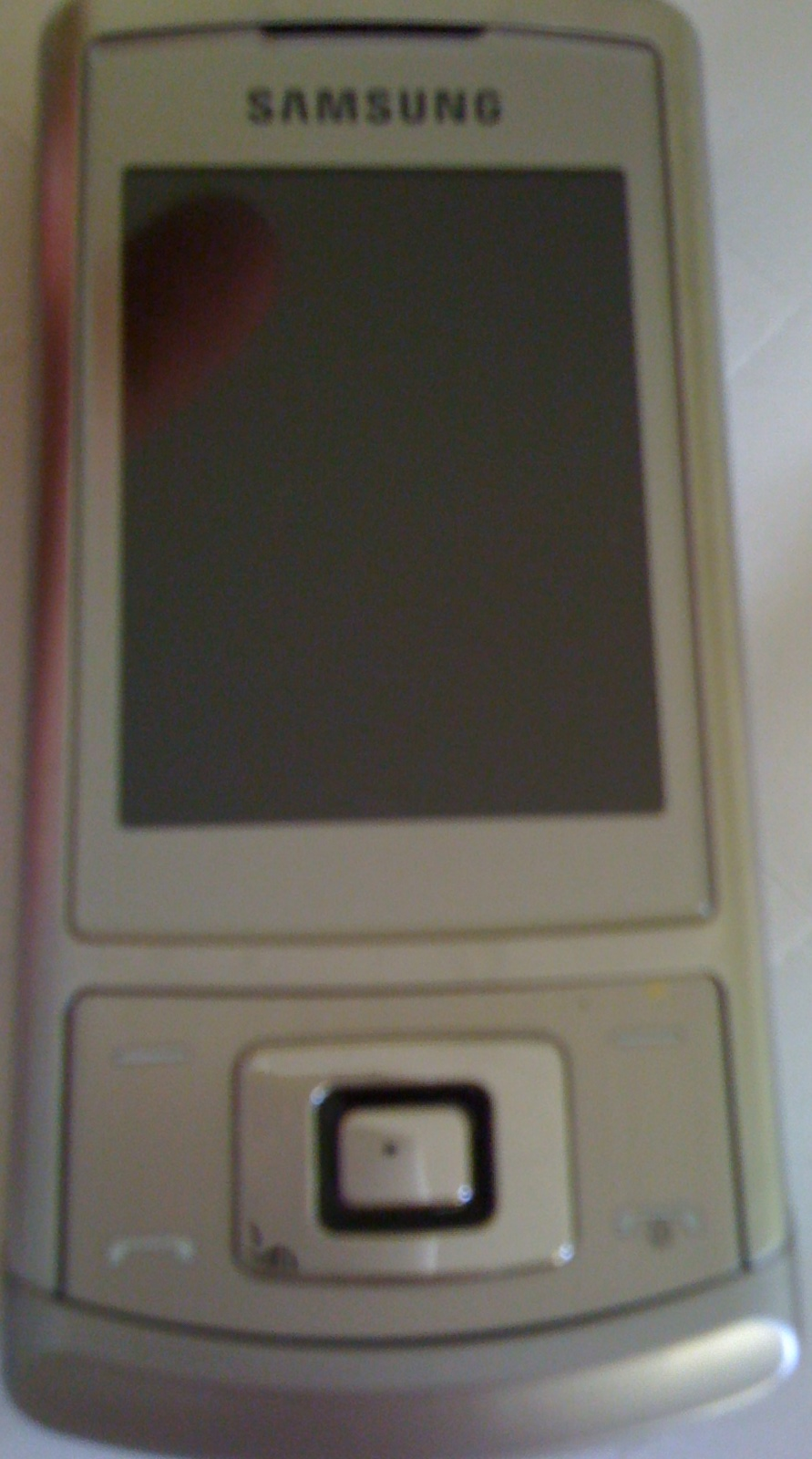
Samsung mobile S3500 cellphone. One of the phones which use the new model numbering system.

Samsung introduced its first mobile phone to India in 2004. In 2008, Samsung Electronics' Telecommunication Business declared its new business strategy focusing on consumer and marketing. Samsung mobile phones are divided into 6 major categories – Style, Infotainment, Multimedia, Connected, Essential and Business.

The SGH-P250 and SGH-J165 were the last phone models sold worldwide, outside North America, that used the original model numbering system. The GT-S7330 was the first mobile phone model to use the new model numbering system.

== Financial information ==
In Q1 2008 Samsung shipped 46.3 million mobile handsets 1Q 2008. Sales of Samsung Telecommunications were 6.65 trillion KRW for the same quarter and it represents 32% sales of Samsung Electronics. The growth is mostly explained by the continuous growth of emerging markets while there is weak demand in developed markets. During 2007 amount of shipped units was growing constantly: 1Q 2007 – 34.8, 2Q 2007 – 37.4, 3Q 2007- 42.6, 4Q 2007 – 46.3. In 2007 profit was 23,8 trillion KRW, while net profit reached a level of 2.7 trillion KRW.

== Highlight products ==
=== Mobile phones ===
Samsung Blue Earth (Samsung S7550) mobile phone includes a solar panel on the back of the phone.

== See also ==
- Samsung Group
- Samsung Electronics
