= Samsung Galaxy Y =

Smartphone by Samsung

Samsung Galaxy Y (GT-S5360)

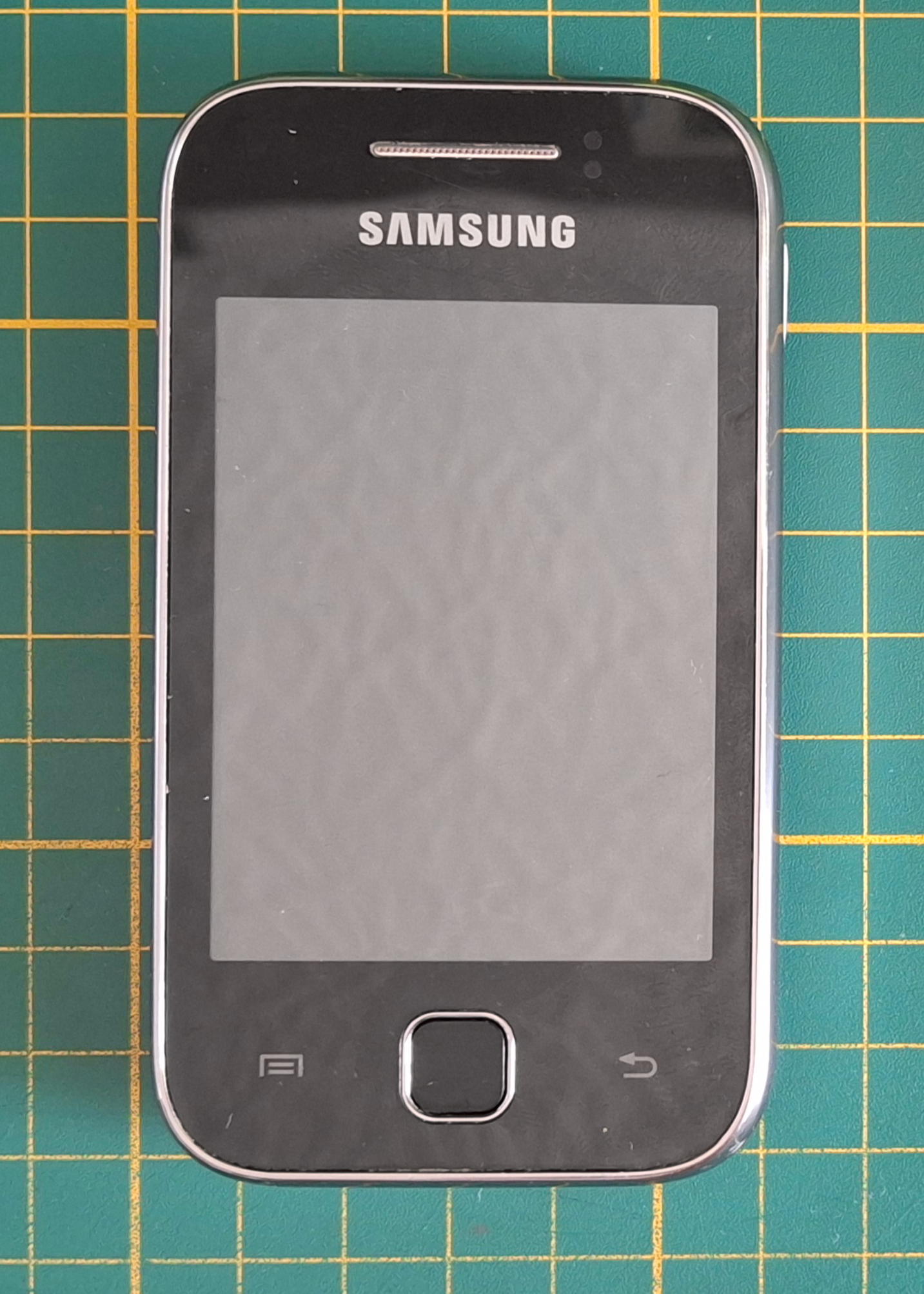
- Samsung Galaxy Y GT-S5360
- Brand: Samsung Galaxy
- Manufacturer: Samsung Electronics
- Type: Smartphone
- First released: October 1, 2011
- Successor: Samsung Galaxy Young
- Related: Samsung Galaxy Y Pro
- Compatible networks: GSM 850/900/1800/3G1900; HSDPA 7.2 Mbps 900/2100
- Form factor: Candybar
- Dimensions: 104 mm (4.1 in) H 58 mm (2.3 in) W 11.5 mm (0.45 in) D
- Weight: 97.5 g (3.44 oz)
- Operating system: Android 2.3.6 Gingerbread (unofficially upgradable to "Ice Cream Sandwich" and "KitKat".)
- CPU: Broadcom BCM21553 ARM11 832 MHz processor, ARMv6
- GPU: Broadcom BCM2763 VideoCore IV LPDDR2 128 MB (neocore: 45.5 fps, Nenamark1: 24.8 fps), 1 gigapixel fill, 40 nm
- Memory: 384 MB RAM, 290 MB user available RAM OS
- Storage: 190 MB (169 MB user available; Extra space is for cache)
- Removable storage: 2 GB microSDHC (up to 32 GB)
- Battery: Li-ion 1200 mAh
- Rear camera: 2 megapixel, 1600×1200 Fixed Focus, 15 fps QVGA 320x240px recording and stills, Panorama & Smile Shot
- Display: 240×320 pixels, 3.0 inch (133 ppi pixel density) TFT capacitive touchscreen, 262144 colors, 18-bit, 60 Hz Refresh Rate
- Connectivity: 3.5 mm TRRS; Wi-Fi Broadcom 4330 chipset (802.11 b/g/n); Bluetooth 3.0; Micro USB 2.0;
- Data inputs: Multi-touch touch screen, headset controls, proximity, magnetometer, accelerometer, aGPS, and stereo FM-radio

Samsung Galaxy Y (GT-S5360) is an Android-based smartphone by Samsung, announced in August 2011. Its main features are 3G connection with speeds up to 7.2 Mbit/s and Wi-Fi.

== Features ==
Galaxy Y features Android 2.3.6 Gingerbread OS with Samsung's proprietary TouchWiz user interface, and has integrated social networking apps and multimedia features, including Google Voice Search, and 5.1 channel audio enhancements. It also has a standard 3.5 mm 4-pin audio jack. The device consists of an 832 MHz ARMv6 processor, 290 MB RAM, 190 MB of internal storage and supports up to 32 GB of removable storage through a microSD card. The phone has a 2 MP camera, a screen with a 240x320 resolution and a multitouch interface with the optional SWYPE virtual keyboard. The phone offers connectivity options such as HSDPA 3G connection up to 7.2 Mbit/s and a Wi-Fi connection.

The phone also offers Remote Controls which allows phone to be locked, tracked and data to be wiped remotely. The Galaxy Y originally ran on Android 2.3.5 ''Gingerbread''. An official upgrade to Android 2.3.6 (Gingerbread) was released via Samsung Kies and Over-the-air. The Galaxy Y can also be flashed and upgraded with custom ROMs such as CyanogenMod releases (although not officially supported by Samsung). It will run CyanogenMod 7, 9, 11 respectively but it is unofficially supported so there may be stability issues.

=== Processor ===
The Galaxy Y uses an 832 MHz ARMv6 along with a Broadcom VideoCore IV (4).

=== Memory ===
The Galaxy Y features 384MB of RAM and 290 MB of dedicated flash internal storage and has a microSDHC slot (up to 32 GB).

=== Display ===
The Galaxy Y has a 3-inch (76 mm) QVGA (240x320) TFT LCD capacitive touchscreen which has a Pixel density of 133 ppi.

=== Camera ===
On the back of the device is a 2-megapixel fixed-focus camera without flash that can record videos in up to a maximum QVGA resolution. The Samsung Galaxy Y does not have a front-facing camera or a secondary microphone for noise cancellation.

== Variants ==
Seven variants of the model exist: S5360L, S5360B (Brazil), S5360T, S5363, S5367, S5368, and S5369. Differences can be in baseband, SAR levels, colour, case design, carrier-branding and lock status. S5360L (Latin America) supports 850 and 1900 MHz UMTS bands. S5363 is typically used as a carrier-rebranded variant by O2. S5369 is a carrier-locked variant for the Italian market.

S5367 is Galaxy Y TV, which was released in April 2012. That model is differentiated by a digital TV receiver; other features different are an included 2 GB MicroSD card, multitouch support, and a 3.15-megapixel camera.

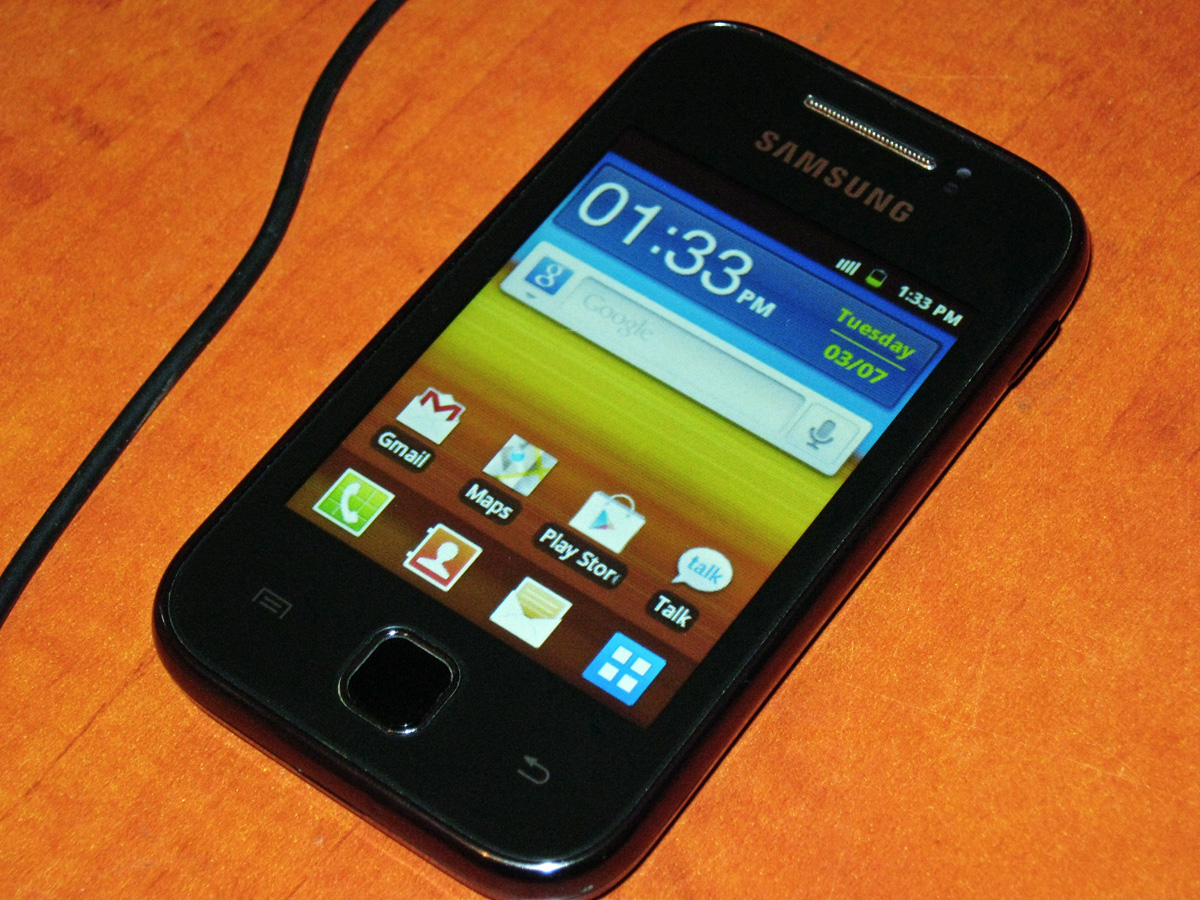
Samsung Galaxy Y running Android Gingerbread 2.3.6

S6102 (Brazilian model is S6102B) is Galaxy Y Duos, phone with dual SIM cards support. Li-ion battery is working with current in 1300 mAh. RAM is 384 Mb. Camera's resolution is 3.2 Mpx. The main screen button was reduced in 2 times but screen's increased until 3.14". S6102 was introduced on 22 December 2011.

== See also ==
- Samsung Galaxy (series)
- List of Android devices
- Samsung Galaxy Y Pro DUOS
- Samsung Galaxy Pocket
