= S5600 =

S5600 may refer to:

- Fujifilm FinePix S5200, a bridge digital camera made by Fujifilm, known in Europe as S5600;
- Samsung S5600, a touch-screen phone by Samsung;
- Samsung S5600v, a touch-screen phone by Samsung.
