= Samsung B3210 =

Cell phone model

Samsung B3210 Genio QWERTY
- Manufacturer: Samsung Mobile
- Series: S-Series
- Availability by region: May 2009
- Predecessor: Samsung Tocco
- Related: Samsung Omnia, Samsung Tocco, Samsung Tocco Ultra Edition
- Compatible networks: GSM 850/900/1800/1900
- Form factor: Candybar
- Dimensions: 104×53×11.9 mm (4.09×2.09×0.47 in)
- Weight: 93.5 g (3 oz)
- Operating system: Samsung Touchwiz 1.0
- Memory: 144 MB
- Removable storage: Micro SD, up to 8 GB
- Battery: Li-lon 1000 mAh
- Rear camera: 2-megapixel
- Display: 240 x 400 pixels
- External display: 3 inches
- Media: MP3, AAC, AAC+, e-AAC+, WMA, AMR, WAV, MP4
- Connectivity: Bluetooth 2.1 and USB 2.0
- Data inputs: T9, Abc
- Other: Touchscreen (Samsung S3650 version only), Full web browser (Jasmine), Haptic Touch feedback

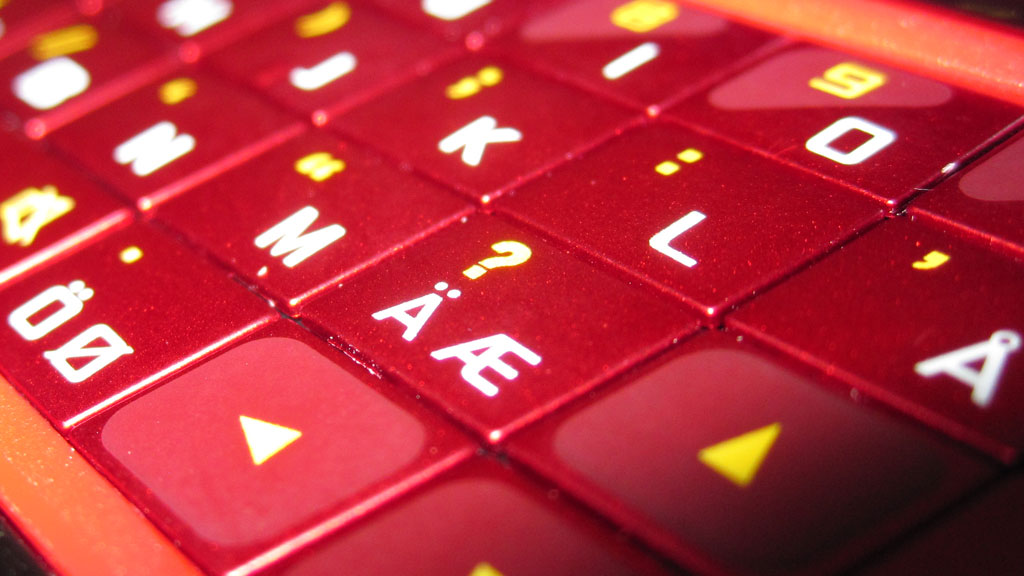
A close-up view of the keyboard keys on the Samsung B3210 (Samsung Corby Pro) phone

Samsung B3210 (also known as Genio QWERTY) is a GSM (2G) phone that was released in October 2009 by Samsung. It has a 2 MP camera and a 2.2-inch TFT screen. In appearance, its design is like a BlackBerry, but in function it is not a smartphone or a 3G phone.

There is also a touch-screen version of the phone, the Samsung S3650, and the related Samsung B5310 with a larger QWERTY keyboard as a slideout.

== Features ==
- Quad-band GSM/EDGE
- 2.2-inch screen of QVGA resolution
- 40 MB onboard storage, microSD card slot (up to 8 GB)
- 2-megapixel fixed-focus camera with smile detection, QVGA@15fps video recording
- FM radio with RDS
- Space for a memory card
- Find Music recognition service
- TouchWiz and Cartoon UI
- Social networking integration with direct file uploads
- Bluetooth with A2DP, USB v.2.0
- Smart unlock
- Interchangeable rear covers
- QWERTY keyboard
- 3.5mm headphone jack

== See also ==
- Mobile phone form factors
- Samsung Telecommunications
