= Samsung W880 =

Cell phone model

Samsung SCH-W880 AMOLED 12
- Manufacturer: Samsung Mobile
- Series: S-Series
- Availability by region: 2010
- Related: Jet, Tocco Lite
- Compatible networks: GSM 800/900/1700/1800/1900/2100; 3G 900/2100
- Form factor: Candybar
- Dimensions: 4.6×2.2×0.6 in (117×56×15 mm)
- Weight: 96 g (3 oz)
- Operating system: TouchWiz v2.0 UI
- Memory: 4GB internal
- Storage: up to 32GB
- Removable storage: microSD/microSDHC
- Battery: Li-lon 1100mAh
- Rear camera: 12MP at 4000x3000 pixels (picture); 720p at 30fps (HD video)
- Display: 16M (colors); 480 x 800 pixels (resolution); 3.3 inches AMOLED
- External display: Yes
- Media: AAC, MP3, WAV, WMA, DivX, H263, H264, MP4, WMV, xVID
- Connectivity: Wi-Fi, HSDPA 7.2 Mbps, Bluetooth 2.0 and USB 2.0

Samsung W880 (also known as Samsung AMOLED 12 in South Korea) was a high-spec mobile phone model from Samsung announced in September 2009. It was the world's first 12 mega pixel camera with 3x optical zoom and 720p HD video.

== Full specifications ==
Camera

- Megapixels: 12
- Maximum photo resolution: 4000×3000 pixels
- Optical zoom: 3x
- Digital zoom: yes
- Auto focus: Yes
- Flash: Yes
- Recording video: 720p HD recording at 30 fps
- Second (front) camera: Yes
