= Samsung S5600 =

2009 mobile phone released by Samsung

Samsung S5600 Preston
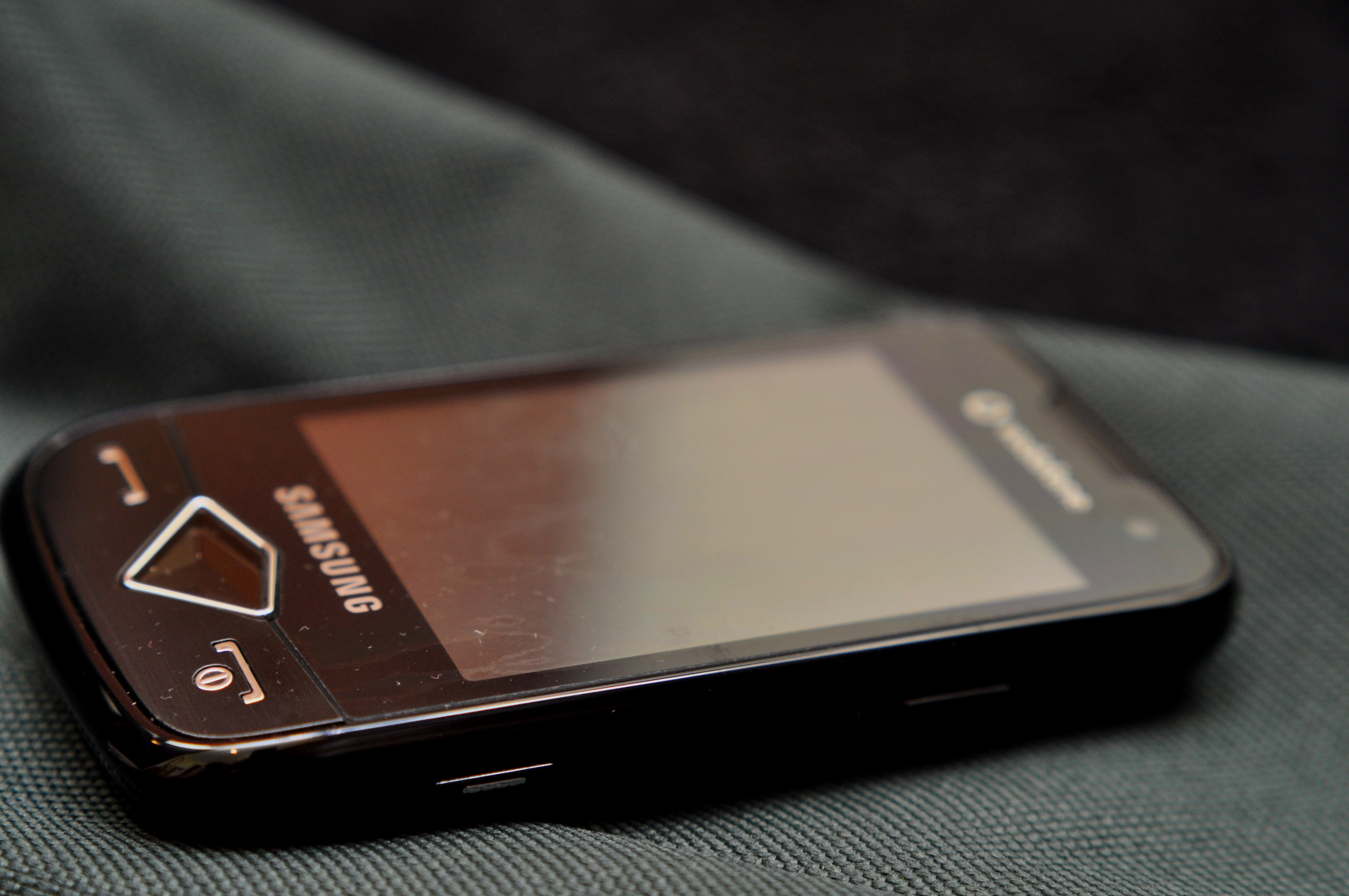
- Manufacturer: Samsung Mobile
- Series: S-Series
- Availability by region: October 2009
- Successor: Samsung Monte (S5620), Samsung S5600v
- Related: Jet, Tocco Lite, Marvel
- Compatible networks: GSM 850/900/1800/1900/2100; 3G 900/2100
- Form factor: Candybar
- Dimensions: 102.8×54.8×12.9 mm (4.05×2.16×0.51 in)
- Weight: 96 g (3 oz)
- Operating system: TouchWiz
- Storage: 80 MB
- Removable storage: microSD up to 16 GB (microSDHC compatible)
- Battery: Li-lon 1000mAh
- Rear camera: 3.15 MP, 2048x1536 pixels, LED flash
- Display: 240 x 320 pixels 16M colors (TFT capacitive touchscreen)
- External display: 2.8 inches
- Media: MP3/WMA/AAC/H.263/H.264/WMV/MP4
- Connectivity: HSDPA 7.2 Mbps, Bluetooth 2.1 and USB 2.0

Samsung S5600 (also known as Samsung Preston or Samsung Player Star (in France)) was announced in March 2009 and released in June 2009 as part of a range of touch-screen smartphones being released by Samsung.

The phone has a 2.8 inches (7.1 cm) (240 x 320 pixels) QVGA full-touch screen, and OS TouchWiz User Interface and "Gesture Lock" feature. A 3.2 megapixel camera, music recognition via the use of Shazam's "Find Music" service, and multi-codec support including H.263, MPEG4 (mp4), and WMV. The connectivity for Internet is 7.2 Mbit/s HSDPA.

== Language support ==
The phone was the first phone to support the Welsh Language and it followed an earlier experiment by the Samsung company who released a phone that supported the Irish language. The phone has a Welsh menu and a predictive text facility that calls on a database of 44,000 words in Welsh. The phone was offered just in Orange shops in Wales in 2009.
