= Samsung S5600v =

Mobile phone

Samsung S5600v Blade
- Manufacturer: Samsung Mobile
- Series: S-Series
- Availability by region: October 2009
- Related: Jet, Tocco Lite
- Compatible networks: GSM 850/900/1800/1900/2100; 3G 900/2100
- Form factor: Candybar
- Dimensions: 102.8×54.8×12.9 mm (4.05×2.16×0.51 in)
- Weight: 96 g (3 oz)
- Operating system: TouchWiz
- Storage: 80 MB
- Removable storage: microSD up to 16 GB (microSDHC compatible)
- Battery: Li-ion 1000mAh
- Rear camera: 3.15 MP, 2048x1536 pixels, LED flash
- Display: 240 x 320 pixels 16M colors (TFT capacitive touchscreen)
- External display: 2.8 inches
- Media: MP3/WMA/AAC/H.263/H.264/WMV/MP4
- Connectivity: HSDPA 7.2 Mbps, Bluetooth 2.1 and USB 2.0

Samsung S5600v (also known as Samsung Blade) is a mobile phone that was announced in June 2009 and released in September 2009 as part of a range of touch-screen phones being released by Samsung. The phone is an updated version of the Samsung S5600.
