= Samsung B3410 =

Mobile phone model

Samsung B3410 Delphi
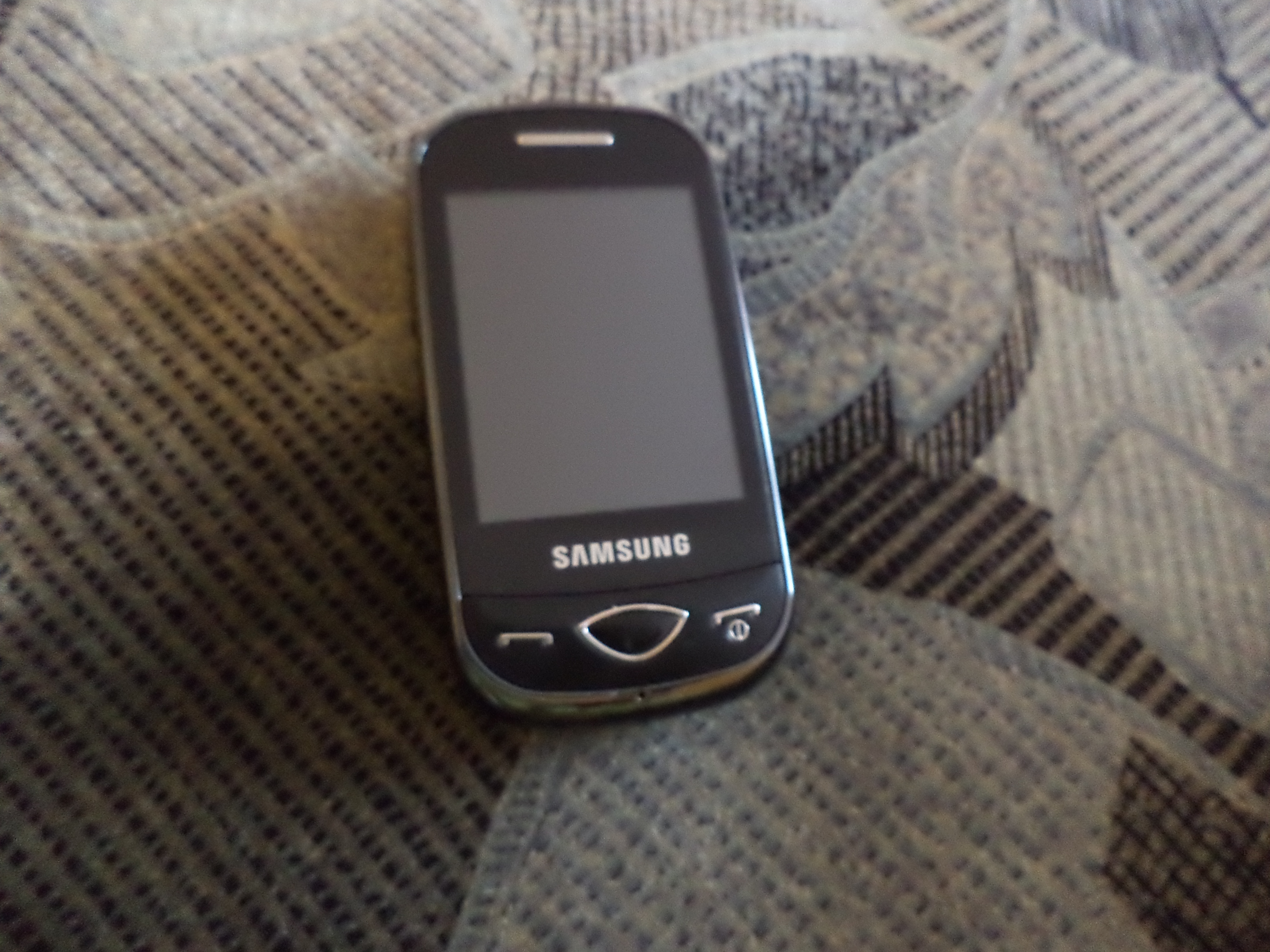
- Manufacturer: Samsung Mobile
- Series: B-Series
- Availability by region: October 2009
- Related: Samsung Corby
- Compatible networks: GSM 850/900/1800/1900, GPRS, EDGE
- Form factor: QWERTY slider
- Dimensions: 102.3×52.4×15.9 mm (4.03×2.06×0.63 in)
- Weight: 113.7 g (4 oz)
- Operating system: TouchWiz 1.0 with Java support
- Storage: 30 MB
- Removable storage: microSD up to 8 GB (microSDHC compatible)
- Battery: 960 mAh Li-ion
- Rear camera: 2 MP
- Display: 2.6 in (66 mm) QVGA 240×320
- Media: MP3, AAC, AAC+, e-AAC+, WMA, AMR, WAV, MP4
- Connectivity: USB 2.0, Bluetooth 2.1, Wi-Fi 802.11b/g (B3410W only)
- Data inputs: QWERTY keyboard, navigation keys, resistive touchscreen
- Other: Full Web browser (NetFront), vibration feedback

The Samsung GT-B3410 (also known as Delphi, Star QWERTY, Ping Touch, Ch@t (for B3410W) and formerly Corby Plus) is a mobile phone released in October 2009 by Samsung. It has a 2 MP camera, 2.6-inch resistive TFT touchscreen and sliding QWERTY keyboard.

The updated version GT-B3410W Ch@t was announced in February 2010 along with the GT-S5620 Monte. It includes Wi-Fi and a new version of the TouchWiz UI.

== Features ==
- Quad-band GSM/EDGE/GPRS
- 2.6-inch resistive TFT touchscreen with QVGA resolution
- 30 MB internal storage, microSD card slot (up to 8 GB)
- 2 MP fixed-focus camera with 4x optical zoom, QVGA@13fps video recording
- FM radio with RDS
- Find Music recognition service
- TouchWiz 1.0 and Cartoon UI (TouchWiz 2.0 in B3410W only)
- Social networking integration with direct file uploads
- Bluetooth 2.1 with A2DP, USB 2.0
- Smart unlock
- Interchangeable rear covers
- Palringo messenger
- Google search
- Java games
- Photo contacts
- Wi-Fi 802.11b/g (B3410W only)
- QWERTY keyboard with screen rotation

== See also ==
- Samsung Omnia
- iPhone
