= Samsung S5560 =

Smartphone model

Samsung S5560 Marvel
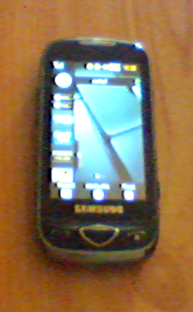
- Manufacturer: Samsung Mobile
- Series: S-Series
- Availability by region: November 2009
- Predecessor: Samsung GT-S5523
- Related: Jet, Tocco Lite
- Compatible networks: GSM 850/900/1800/1900/2100; EDGE
- Form factor: Candybar
- Dimensions: 107.5×52×13.2 mm (4.23×2.05×0.52 in)
- Weight: 95.3 g (3 oz)
- Operating system: TouchWiz(Java)
- Memory: 78 MB Internal Memory.
- Storage: 78MB
- Removable storage: microSD up to 16GB (microSDHC compatible)
- Battery: Li-ion 1000mAh
- Rear camera: 5.0 MP, 2592x1944 pixels, LED flash
- Front camera: No
- Display: 240 x 400 pixels TFT resistive touchscreen, 256K colors
- External display: 3.0 inches
- Media: MP3/WMA/AAC/H.263/H.264/WMV/MP4/3GP/WAV/M4A
- Connectivity: Bluetooth 2.1 and USB 2.0 and WIFI
- Data inputs: Touch

Samsung S5560 (also known as Samsung Marvel) was announced in October 2009 and released in November 2009 as part of a range of touch-screen smartphones released by Samsung. It sits between the Tocco Lite and the Samsung Jet.

== Specifications ==
- 3-inch touchscreen
- 5-megapixel camera with LED flash and autofocus
- Smile and Blink detection, with image stabilization
- WiFi connectivity
- Stereo FM radio with RDS and 3.5mm audio jack
- Widgets - Facebook, Orkut, Picassa, etc.
- Long Battery Life (up 9 hours)
- Touch Wiz & Accelerator
- resolution of 240 x 400 pixels.
- 78 MB Internal memory

== Limitations ==
- Limited In-Call Menu options

== See also ==
- Samsung S5560i
