= Samsung S5560i =

Mobile phone model

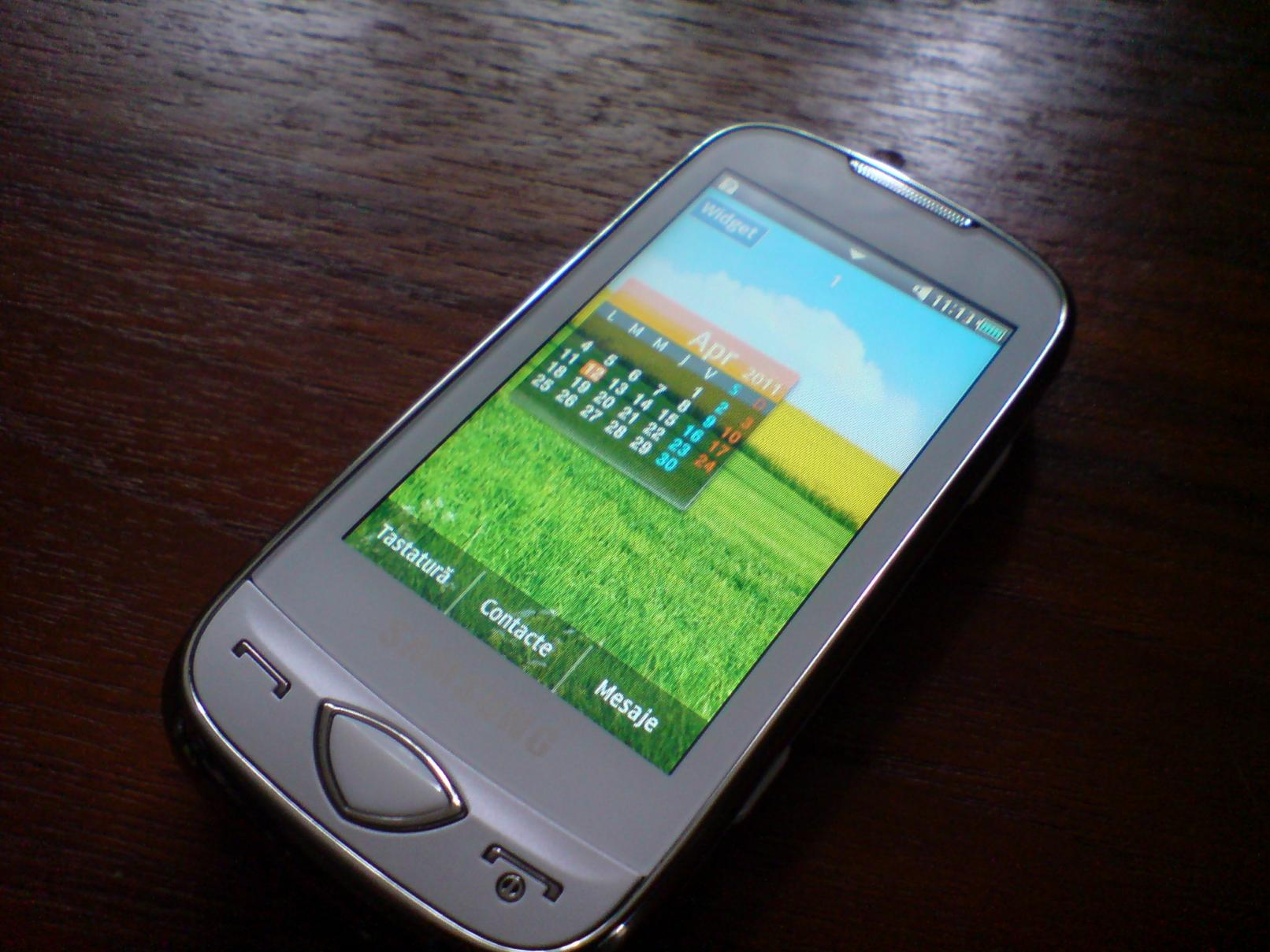
- Manufacturer: Samsung Mobile
- Series: S-Series
- Availability by region: January 2011
- Predecessor: S5560 (Marvel)
- Related: S5560 (Marvel), Samsung Corby
- Compatible networks: GSM 850/900/1800/1900/2100; EDGE
- Form factor: Candybar
- Dimensions: 107.5×52×12.9 mm (4.23×2.05×0.51 in)
- Weight: 95.3 g (3 oz)
- Operating system: TouchWiz V.3
- Memory: 78 MB Internal Memory.
- Storage: 30MB
- Removable storage: microSD up to 8GB (microSDHC compatible)
- Battery: Li-ion 1000mAh
- Rear camera: 5.0 MP, 2592x1944 pixels, LED flash
- Front camera: No
- Display: 240 x 400 pixels TFT capacitive touchscreen, 16M colors
- External display: 3.0 inches, 155.49 PPI
- Media: MP3/WMA/AAC/H.263/H.264/WMV/MP4
- Connectivity: Bluetooth 2.1 and USB 2.0

Samsung S5560i is an improved version of S5560 (Marvel). It has a 3.0 inches capacitive touchscreen and 16M colors. The phone is available in black and pearl white versions. It has an improved camera and lens, an improved screen, battery and improved interface than previous model S5560 (Marvel).
