= Samsung Corby Speed =

Smartphone developed by Samsung

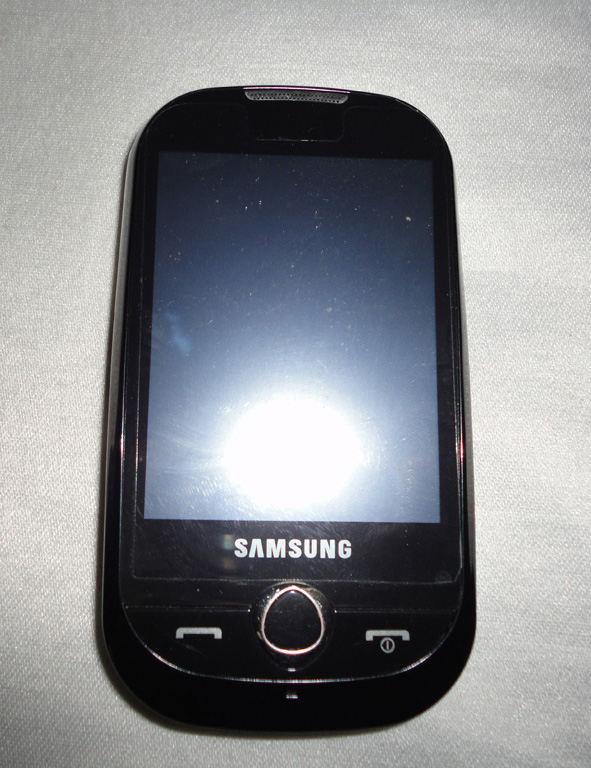
- Manufacturer: Samsung Telecommunications
- Type: Mobile phone
- Dimensions: 103×56.5×12.2 mm (4.06×2.22×0.48 in)
- Display: 262,000 Colour TFT, 2.8” Size, QVGA display.
- Model: SCH-F339

The Samsung Corby Speed is a smartphone developed by Samsung Telecommunications. It is the Code-division multiple access (CDMA) version of the Samsung Corby series of phones. It also allows users to access the internet at a maximum speed of 2.4 Mbit/s through its Open Market Handset system (OMH). The phone was launched in 2009 and it supported full service (voice and data) across all CDMA operators using OMH SIM Cards like Tata Indicom, Reliance Mobile, MTS and Virgin Mobile.

== Design ==
The phone is based on the original Corby design features incorporating bright colors, contours and a curved body design. It was released with three back covers.

== Features ==
The phone's features include a 2.8 inch QVGA full touchscreen, 262K TFT LCD, 80 MB internal memory and supports up to 8 GB with a Micro SD card. The phone has Bluetooth 2.0. It has a 2-megapixel camera, A built-in FM receiver and supports Poly 64, SP-Midi, i-melody, MP3, AAC, AAC+, WMA music formats. Corby comes with a 960 mAh battery. It also allows users to access the internet at a maximum speed of 2.4 Mbit/s through its Open Market Handset system (OMH). The phone was launched in 2009 and it supported full service (voice and data) across all CDMA operators using OMH SIM Cards like Tata Indicom, Reliance Mobile, MTS and Virgin Mobile.
