= Samsung F480 Tocco =

Touch-screen mobile phone announced and released by Samsung Mobile

Samsung SGH-F480/F488 (Tocco)
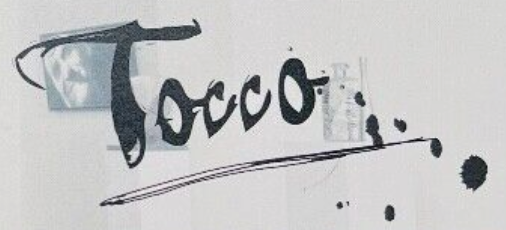

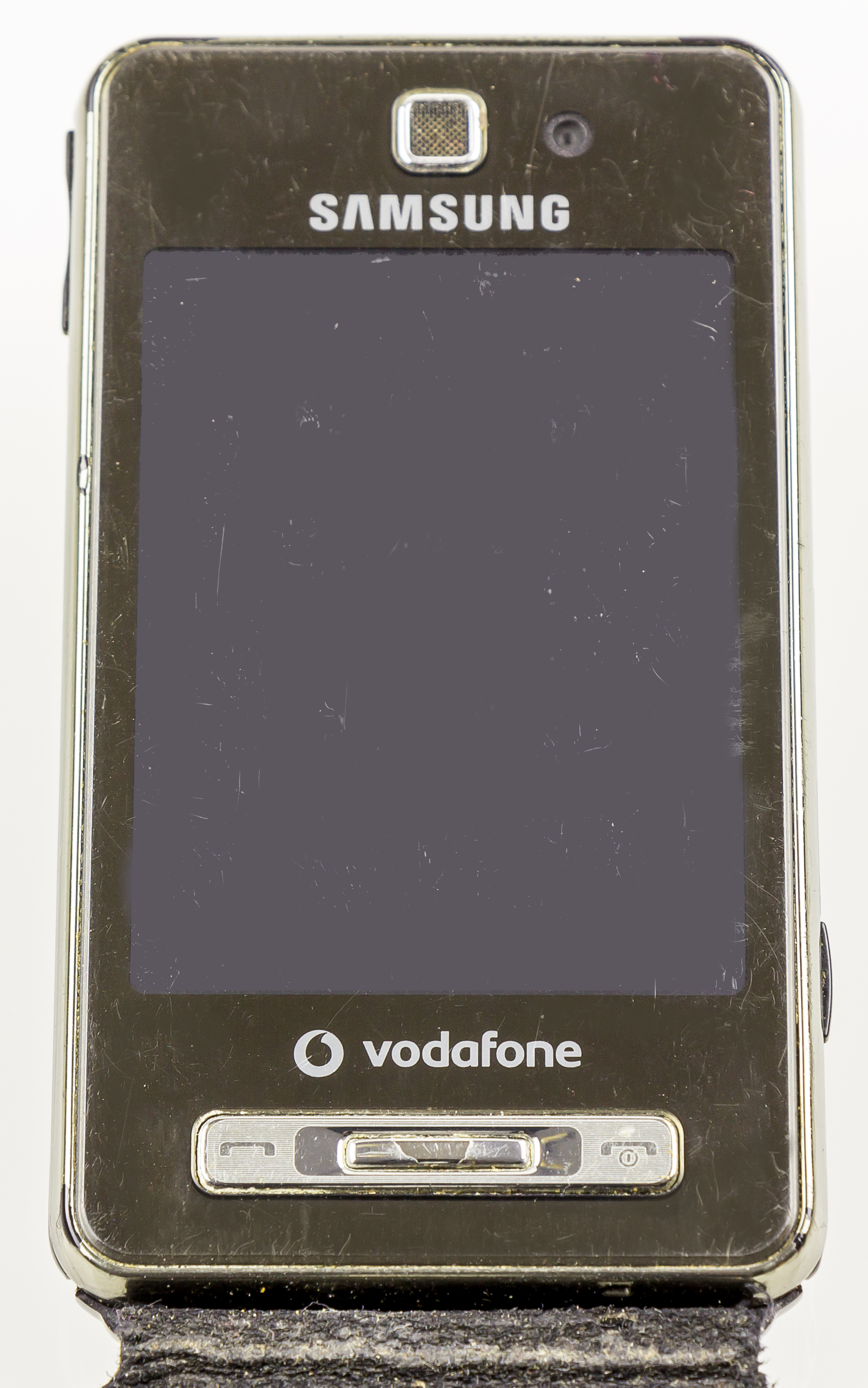
- Vodafone-branded F480
- Manufacturer: Samsung Electronics
- Series: F-Series
- Availability by region: F480/F488: May 2008; F480i: August 2009
- Predecessor: SGH-F700
- Successor: SGH-F480i
- Related: Samsung Omnia, iPhone
- Compatible networks: GSM 900/1800/1900; HSDPA 2100
- Form factor: Candybar
- Dimensions: 95.9×55×11.5 mm (3.78×2.17×0.45 in)
- Weight: 100.6 g (4 oz)
- Operating system: Samsung Mocha with TouchWiz 1.0
- Storage: 228 MB (internal)
- Removable storage: up to 16 GB MicroSDHC
- Battery: Li-ion, 1000 mAh
- Rear camera: 5 Mpix
- Front camera: VGA video call
- Display: 240 × 320 pixels
- External display: 2.8 inches
- Connectivity: Bluetooth and USB 2.0
- Data inputs: Touch screen, T9 predictive text input option

The Samsung SGH-F480, marketed and branded as Tocco in many English-spoken countries or as Player Style in France, and its variant, the SGH-F488, are touchscreen mobile phones announced on February 11, 2008 at Mobile World Congress 2008 and released in May 2008 by Samsung Mobile. Taking design cues from its Armani-branded P520, both phones are Samsung's third touchscreens and feature a 2.8-inch 240×320px display, a 5-megapixel camera and a memory card holder up to 16 GB, and were the first to be tagged with the TouchWiz user interface. They came in three colours: black, pink, and gold.

In the U.S. the Samsung T919 Behold was sold which is mostly the same but has a 3.0-inch display, an accelerometer, and GPS support.

== Features ==
The devices uses a 2.8 in (7.1 cm) haptic TFT touch screen that can render 256,000 colors. Software-wise it uses Samsung's proprietary "TouchWiz UI" which was made as the replacement of the previous "Croix UI" that appeared on phones such as the F700. The device has a slimline and compact hardware design with a metallic back and sides. Compared to the F490 introduced at the same time, the F480 lacks a 3.5 mm headphone jack and is smaller in size.

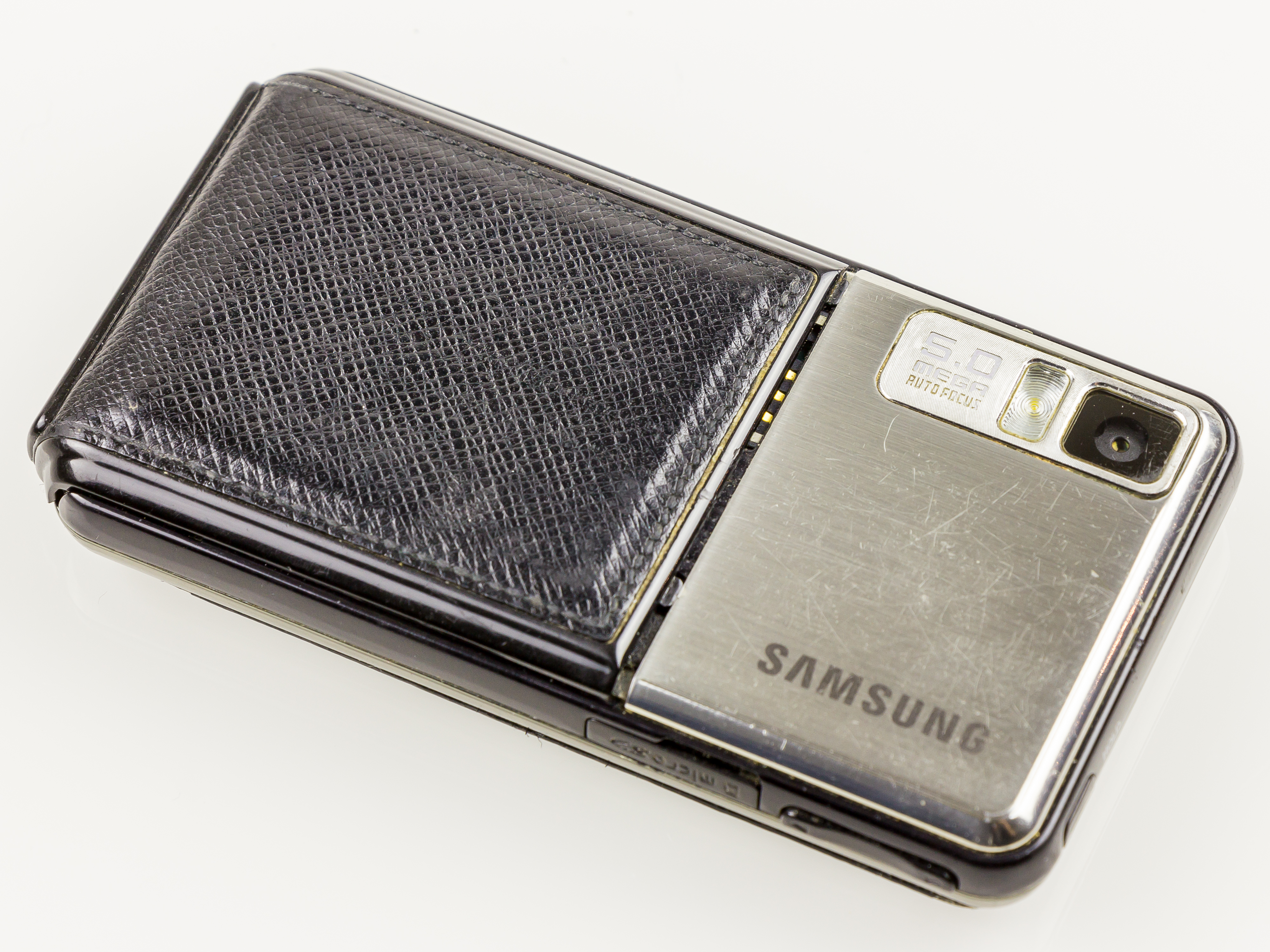
Back of the handset (with additional leather attached)

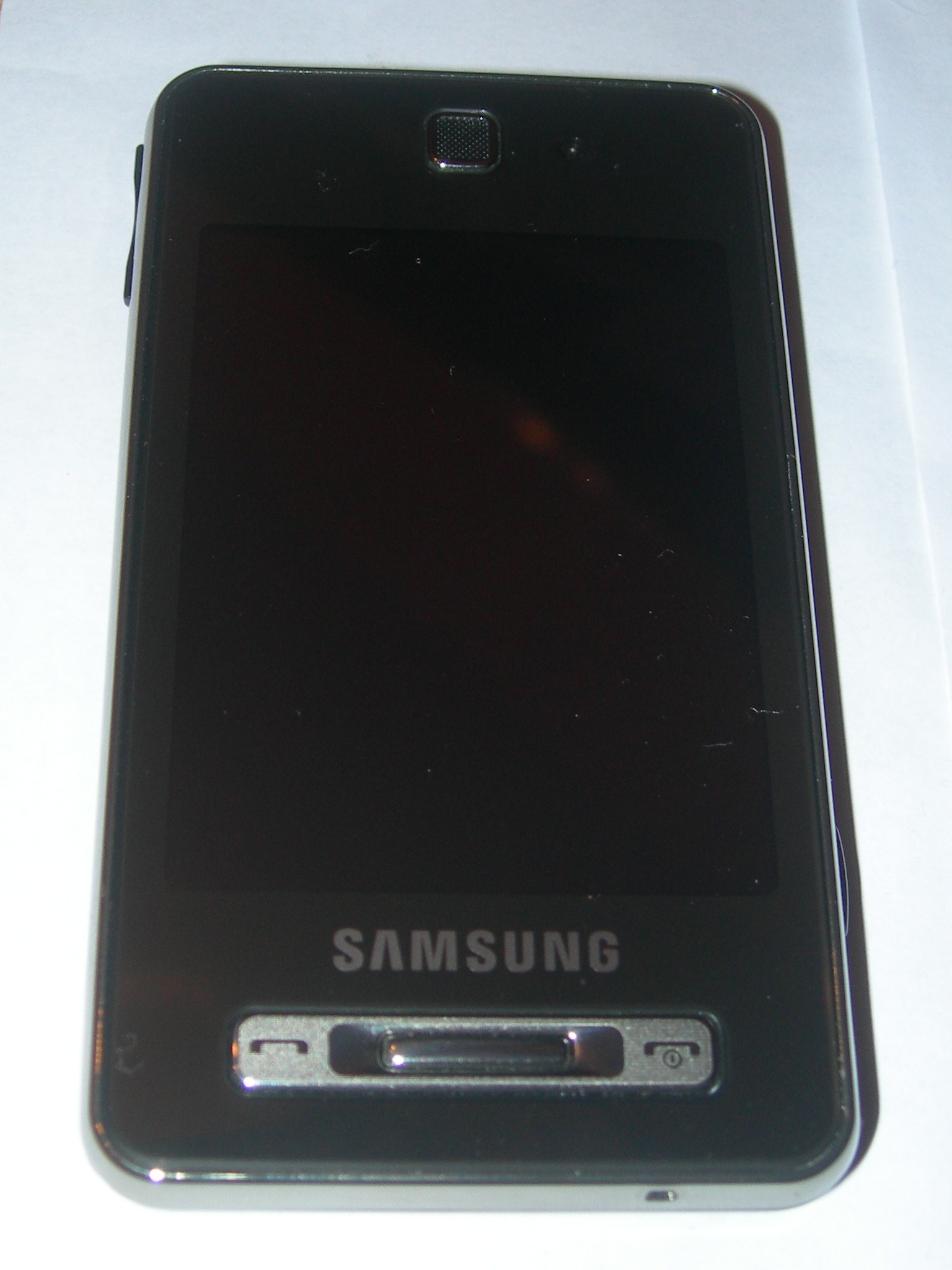
Front (carrier-unbranded)

The phone operates on the GSM and EDGE standards at 900, 1800, and 1900 MHz bands. The F480 supports 3G HSDPA data at 7.2 megabits per second on the 2100 MHz band. It offers a WAP 2.0-compliant web browser, and uses MIDP 2.0 as its Java support platform. This allows installing the Opera Mini browser, which is more up-to-date and advanced than the native browser. The latter is still good for quick access to the mobile Internet.

The phone features a 5-megapixel camera with LED flash, auto-focus, face recognition, smile mode, 4× digital zoom, and video recording capability. It allows users to edit photos and videos, and add effects to photos. The device also contains music-recognition software. With up-to-date firmware, it can support 16-gigabyte microSD cards. Bluetooth support is included.

The F480 uses a 1,000 mAh lithium-ion battery that provides up to three hours of talk time or 250 hours of standby time.

== Reception ==
The F480 Tocco was a considerable success for Samsung. Samsung claimed that the F480 Tocco was the best-selling contract mobile phone in the UK in the second quarter of 2008.

A slightly improved version with a Broadcom chipset and newer UI, the SGH-F480i, was later announced on February 16, 2009 at Mobile World Congress 2009 and was released in August. Other devices would also be launched extending the Tocco name: the full-touch budget Samsung S5230 ("Tocco Lite" or "Star") and the sliding touch Samsung S8300 ("Tocco Ultra" or "UltraTOUCH").

== Related pages ==
- LG Cookie
- Samsung T919 Behold
- Samsung i900 Omnia
- Samsung Solstice
- Sony Ericsson C902
- Nokia 5800 XpressMusic
- Samsung U900 Soul
- Samsung P520 Giorgio Armani
- Samsung S8000 Jet
