= Samsung U940 Glyde =

Smartphone model

Samsung SCH-U940 Glyde
- Manufacturer: Samsung
- Availability by region: May 2008
- Discontinued: Late 2009
- Related: Samsung F700
- Compatible networks: CDMA 800/1900, Verizon Wireless
- Form factor: Side-Slider with QWERTY keypad
- Dimensions: 4.09 x 1.97 x 0.70 inches (103.8 x 50 x 17.8 mm)
- Weight: 117g (4.13 oz)
- Operating system: BREW, Samsung Touchwiz
- Memory: 57 MB
- Removable storage: Up To 8 GB, expandable SD
- Battery: 1000 mAh
- Rear camera: 2.0-megapixel
- Display: TFT 240 x 440
- External display: Resistive touch screen (earlier models) or Capacitive touch screen (later models)
- Connectivity: Bluetooth / Micro USB Cable / 2.5mm Audio Jack
- Hearing aid compatibility: M4

Samsung SCH-U940 (or Samsung Glyde) is a Verizon Wireless touch-screen smartphone made by Samsung. The Glyde was based on the popular European Croix, but was later adapted for the United States. It was released in late May 2008 in Verizon stores. As of August 2009, the phone is no longer listed for sale on Verizon's website. The phone features touch screen navigation, a 2.0-megapixel camera/camcorder with flash, customizable shortcut menus, and a full HTML browser. The phone has been replaced by a newer version, the Samsung Rogue.

== Form and size ==
The Glyde has a touch screen and a slide out QWERTY keyboard. On the front of the phone, the only buttons are the home button, the screen lock button, the camera/camcorder button and the rocker switch. When on the main phone touch screen without the QWERTY keyboard slid out, displayed on the screen are the dial pad, menu, contacts, quick navigation, and taskbar icons. With the QWERTY keyboard slid out, the layout is switched to landscape and a messaging icon is placed in the lower left hand side of the touch screen. The phone has stereo speakers on the top of the phone, a 2.5 mm headphone jack, and a 2.0-megapixel camera on the back. Underneath the back cover, is the battery and the microSD slot. The actual size of the phone is 4.09 inches in height, 0.7 inches in depth, and 1.97 inches in width. It is 4.13 ounces.

== Features ==
The Glyde's main navigation is done through the touch screen that takes up much of the front side. The screen is only capable of registering one touch at a time. When touching it in two or more places, it typically registers that you are touching it in between the touches. Once you open the slide out keyboard, the screen flips to a landscape mode so that it can be viewed on its side. This is the only way to switch the phone to landscape mode due to the lack of an accelerometer. The main menu consists of eight tiles including the Media Center button, which lets you view your pictures, ringtones, videos, games, and apps which can be downloaded through the "Browse and Download" menu. The menu also contains a Messaging, Contacts, Recent Calls, Settings & Tools, My Music, Browser, and VZ Navigator tile. Tapping on the VZ Navigator tile without buying it will bring you to a video showing you the features of Verizon's GPS service. The camera on the device is 2.0 megapixels, and can be used to take pictures or record up to ten minute videos. The camera has a built in LED flash, three quality settings (Fine, Normal, and Economy), color effects, white balance settings, ISO settings, auto focus, a self-timer, multishot, six picture resolutions (1600x1200, 1280x960, 1024x768, 640x480, 320x240, and 176x144), and digital zoom (the zoom feature cannot be used when the resolution is set to 1600x1200). Videos can only be recorded in two resolutions (320x240 and 176x144). There are two video recording time options, one for sending a message, and one for saving the videos. If set to "Limit for Send," the recording time is set to 30 seconds, the video quality is set to economy and cannot be changed, and the resolution is set to 176x144 and cannot be changed. In the music player, you can play music stored on your phone or on your microSD card. There are four search categories for music, genres, artists, albums, and song names, or you can just search for anything. You can also make playlists, play all of music, or play all of your music in shuffle mode. When listening to music, you cannot access any other menus without stopping your music. This includes getting a call or text message.

== Known issues ==
When Samsung introduced the Glyde in May 2008, it was meant to be a high-end phone that could compete with the Apple iPhone 3G and HTC Dream. It was one of the hottest-selling phones of 2008. Unfortunately, in November 2008, it was discovered that the Glyde's capacitive touch screen was problematic and would not always respond to the user's touch. Therefore, Verizon Wireless suspended all sales of the Glyde until Samsung re-introduced the Glyde later that month with a resistive touch screen. In early 2009, the Glyde was still experiencing User Interface issues and Verizon Wireless had released several OTA Software Updates to fix the problems. This included revising the |UI. In September 2009, the Glyde was officially discontinued after proving to be unrepairable and it was replaced by the Samsung SCH-u960, or Samsung Rogue, that month.

== Specifications ==
Category	Sub-Category
3G	Yes
Camera	Yes
HTML Browser	Yes
microSD slot	Yes
Touch Navigation	Yes
Mobile IM	Yes
Mobile Email	Yes
QWERTY Keyboard	Yes
Bluetooth Capable	Yes
Antenna	Internal
Vibration Alert	Yes
Music Player	Yes
VCAST	Yes

== Sources ==
Verizon Wireless Glyde
