= Samsung M7500 Emporio Armani =

Mobile phone model

Samsung GT-M7500 Emporio Armani
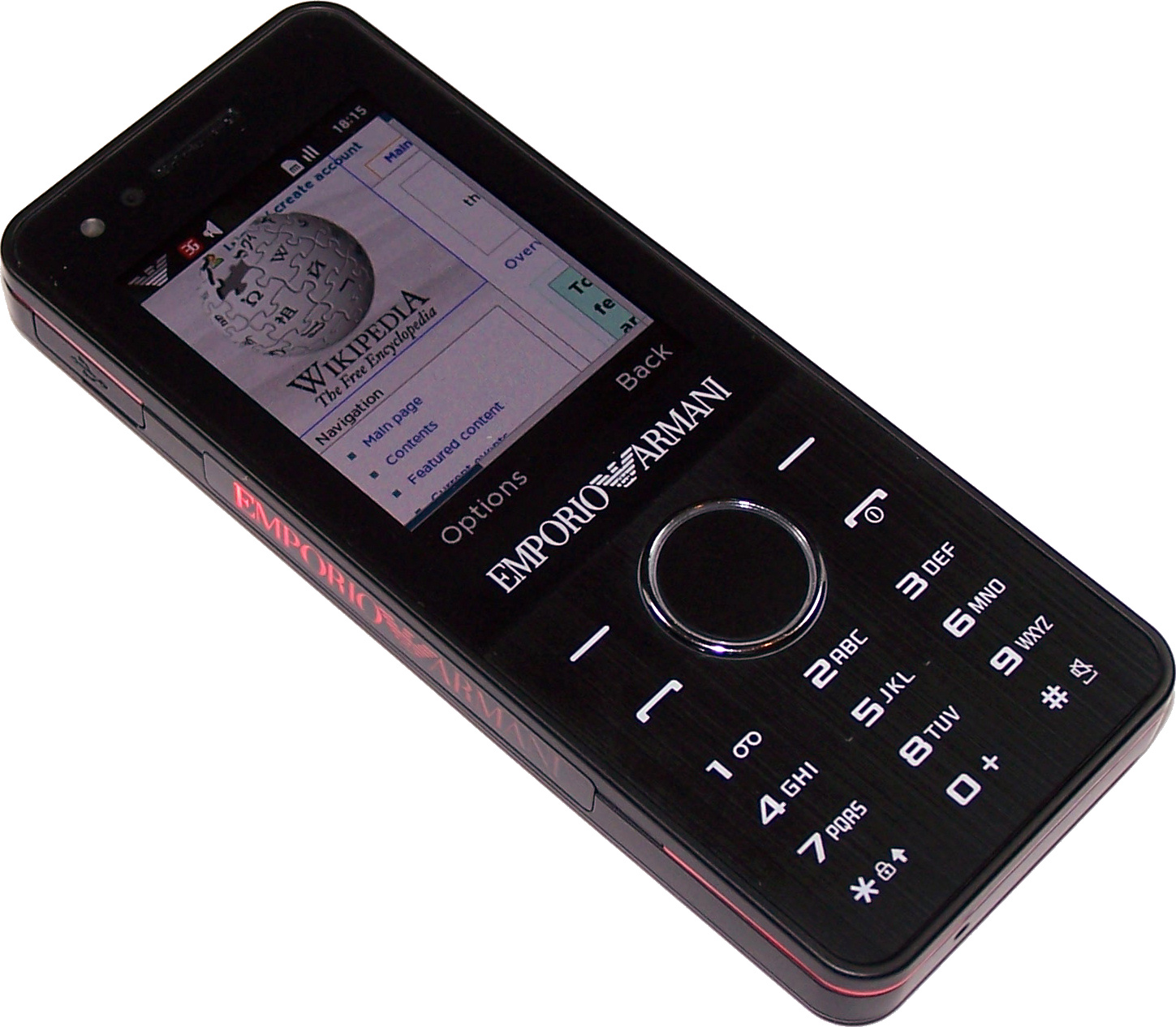
- Manufacturer: Samsung
- Availability by region: 2009-Q2
- Compatible networks: HSUPA 5.76 Mbit/s / HSDPA 7.2 Mbit/s, EDGE/GPRS Class 12 Quad Band (850 / 900 / 1800 / 1900), UMTS Tri Band (900 / 1900 / 2100 MHz)
- Form factor: Candybar
- Dimensions: 114.9×47.4×12 mm (4.52×1.87×0.47 in)
- Weight: 90.2 g (3 oz)
- Memory: 120 MB internal
- Removable storage: microSDHC 16 GB max (32 GB Max MicroSDHC available in 2009)
- Battery: 1500 mAh
- Rear camera: 3 MP, 3264x2448 pixels, autofocus, LED flash
- Display: 2.2" AMOLED (240 x 320)
- Connectivity: USB 2.0, Bluetooth 2.0

Samsung GT-M7500 (known as Samsung Emporio Armani "Night Effect") is a candybar phone that was announced in January 2009. One of the key selling points of the handset was the user-selectable lighting effects that it came with, plus prominent Emporio Armani branding. As of January 2014, this is the only official Emporio Armani handset products, although Samsung have produced Giorgio Armani branded handsets such as a special edition of the Samsung Galaxy S.

== Features ==
- Screen size: 2.2 inch OLED screen
- Resolution: 240 x 320 pixels
- Phone dimensions: 114.9 x 47.4 x 12 mm
- Weight: 90.2 g
- Standby Time: Up to 290 hrs
- Talk Time: Up to 4 hrs 20 mins
- 120 MB internal memory
- 3-megapixel camera
- 3.5mm headphone jack
- 3G (HSDPA), EDGE, GPRS, and HSCSD
- Dedicated music keys
- FM radio with RDS
- Messaging: SMS, MMS, Email
- microSD Card Slot (TransFlash)

== See also ==
- Samsung P520 Giorgio Armani
