= Samsung SGH-P520 Giorgio Armani =

2007 smartphone by Samsung Electronics

Samsung SGH-P520 (Giorgio Armani)
- Manufacturer: Samsung Electronics
- Availability by region: September 24, 2007
- Predecessor: Samsung P310
- Compatible networks: GSM 900/1800/1900 mHz, EDGE
- Form factor: bar
- Dimensions: 88 mm × 54 mm × 11.6 mm (3.46 in × 2.13 in × 0.46 in)
- Weight: 102 g
- Memory: 60 MB
- Removable storage: microSD (Max 2 GB)
- Battery: 960 mAh
- Rear camera: 3-megapixel
- Display: QVGA (320 × 240 pixels), 262k colors
- Connectivity: Bluetooth
- Data inputs: Via touchscreen or QWERTY keyboard

The Samsung SGH-P520 is a smartphone created by Samsung Electronics, announced on September 24, 2007, at a Giorgio Armani fashion show in Milan in a partnership between the two companies.

It is the successor to the Samsung P310 (and the P300 before that), classified by Samsung as a "credit card-phone". Originally retailing at 750 euros ($1100), it has a 2.6-inch touchscreen with haptic feedback similar to that of the LG Viewty and a 3-megapixel camera. It uses Samsung's "Croix" user interface.

The Samsung Giorgio Armani's design would heavily influence the Samsung Tocco handset in 2008.

== Reception ==
Mobile-review.com praised the screen quality as being among the best, but the reviewer found texting on it "fiddly". TechRadar liked the slim and stylish design along with the haptic display, but criticised the user interface and lack of 3G or Wi-Fi. Softpedia called it a 'copycat' of LG's Prada handset.

== See also ==
- LG Prada
- Samsung G800
- Samsung M7500 Emporio Armani
- Samsung Ultra Smart F700
- Samsung F480 Tocco
