= Samsung Ultra Smart F700 =

Smartphone manufactured by Samsung

Samsung SGH-F700 (Ultra Smart/Qbowl)
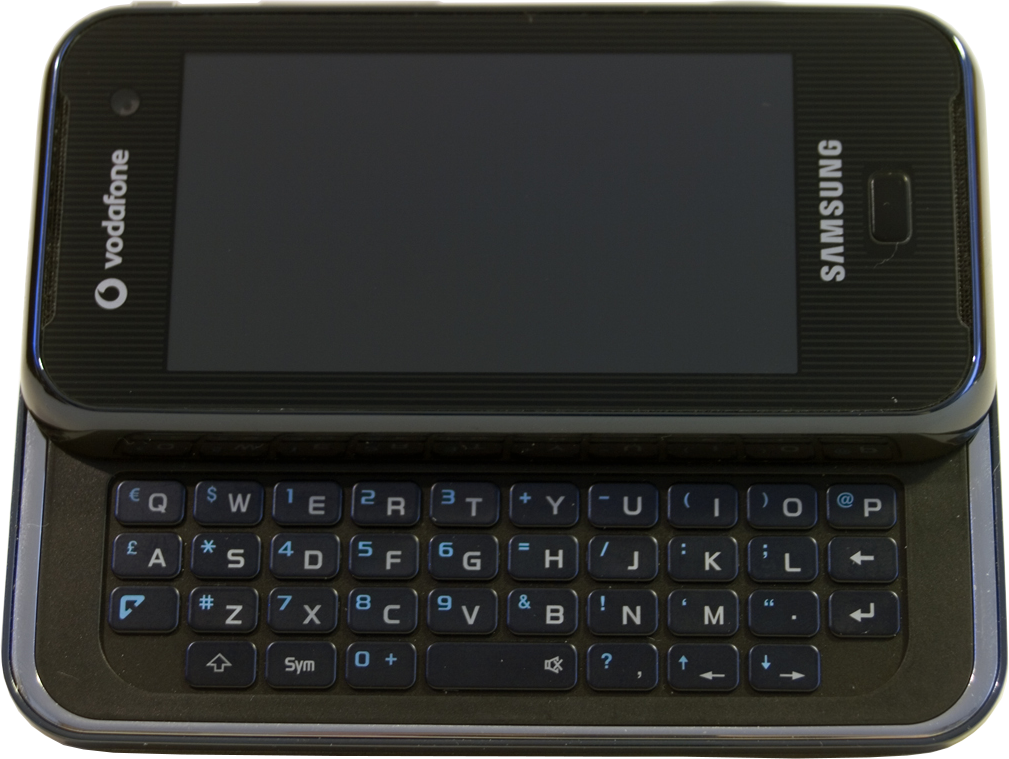
- Manufacturer: Samsung Electronics
- Availability by region: November 2007
- Predecessor: SGH-F520 (unreleased)
- Successor: SGH-F490
- Compatible networks: GSM 900/1800/1900, UMTS 2100 MHz, GPRS, EDGE, HSDPA
- Dimensions: 112×56×15.9 mm (4.41×2.20×0.63 in)
- Weight: 139 g
- Operating system: Croix
- Memory: 100 MB
- Rear camera: 3.15 Megapixel
- Display: 432 x 240 pixel, 262k color touch screen
- Connectivity: USB, Bluetooth, 2.5 mm jack
- Data inputs: Touch screen, Predictive Text Input, QWERTY keyboard

The Samsung SGH-F700, also marketed as the Samsung Ultra Smart F700 or Samsung Qbowl, is a smartphone manufactured by Samsung. Using Vodafone as its network provider, the phone was first introduced at the 3GSM World Congress that was held in February 2007. Sales to the European market started in November 2007.

External images
- Photo with slid out kb
- showing rounded corners

The phone has a 3.2" color display and incorporates a touch screen/touch pad interaction system and a slide-out QWERTY key pad. The phone contains a 3.15 megapixel camera (early reports claimed a 5-megapixel sensor). Furthermore, the handset is HSDPA and Bluetooth 2.0 compatible and possesses USB and microSD memory slots. A Korean design patent for this black, rectangular, round-cornered phone was filed by Samsung in December 2006 prior to the release of the image of the iPhone but after the release of the HTC TyTn which it resembles with its rectangular design and slide out keyboard.

The touchscreen allows the control of the entire handset. The "Croix UI" was awarded the iF Communication Design Award for 2007. A Trusted Reviews article said that the Ultra Smart F700 "kicks iPhone's butt."

The phone was also introduced as the Samsung U940 Glyde on Verizon Wireless in May 2008.

The F700 was succeeded by the Samsung F490 in 2008. Its cheaper variant, the F480, was better known as the Samsung Tocco.

== Specifications ==
- Networks: GSM 900/1800/1900, UMTS 2100 MHz
- Data Connectivity: GPRS, EDGE, UMTS (3G), HSDPA
- Display: 432 x 240 pixel, 262k color with resistive touch screen
- Camera: 3.15 megapixels with video, flash and auto-focus
- Multimedia: MPEG4, H.263, H.264, MP3, AAC+, eAAC+, Real
- Memory: microSD/SDHC (T-Flash)
- Input: Touch screen, Predictive Text Input, sliding QWERTY keyboard
- Connectivity: USB, Bluetooth, 3.5 mm jack

== See also ==
- Samsung P520 Giorgio Armani
- Samsung G800
- Samsung i900 Omnia
- Samsung U900 Soul
- LG Viewty
- LG Prada
- Nokia N95
- iPhone
