= LG GD510 Pop =

Cell phone model

LG GD510
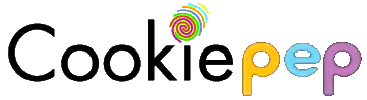

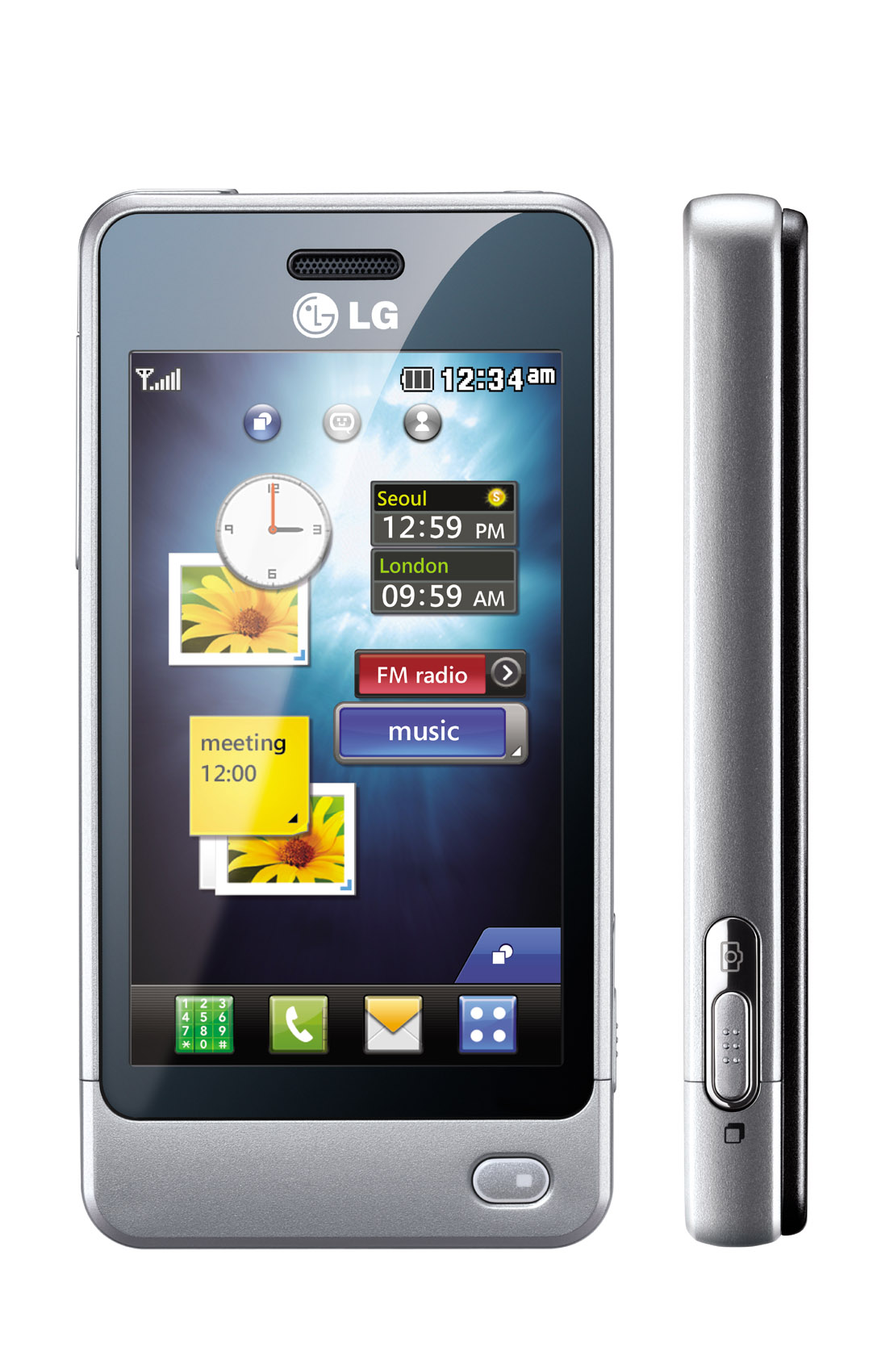
- Manufacturer: LG Electronics
- Availability by region: October 2009
- Compatible networks: GSM/GPRS/EDGE Quad band (850/900/1800/1900)
- Form factor: Candybar
- Dimensions: 97.8×49.5×11.2 mm (3.85×1.95×0.44 in)
- Weight: 87 g
- Memory: microSD Internal Memory Slot, adjacent to battery.
- Rear camera: 3.15 megapixel, video QVGA (15FPS)
- Display: 256K colour TFT touchscreen, 240 × 400 px
- Connectivity: Bluetooth 2.1, USB 2.0

The LG GD510, marketed as the LG Pop globally and as LG Cookie Pep in India, is an entry-level touchscreen mobile phone made by LG Electronics. It was first announced on September 30, 2009 and was released in October 2009. It is considered to be the successor of the LG Cookie.

LG claimed that the Pop was the "world's smallest touchscreen phone". It featured a 3.0 inch display and dimensions of 97.8×49.5×11.2 mm.

As of February 2010 the Pop has sold a million units.

The LG Pop had a solar power option, a small panel which would fit on the back of the phone that would render electricity to the battery. With the solar power option, the phone had a CO_{2} emissions calculation app—in units of trees or mass of CO_{2}.
