= Samsung B5310 =

Mobile phone created by Samsung Electronics

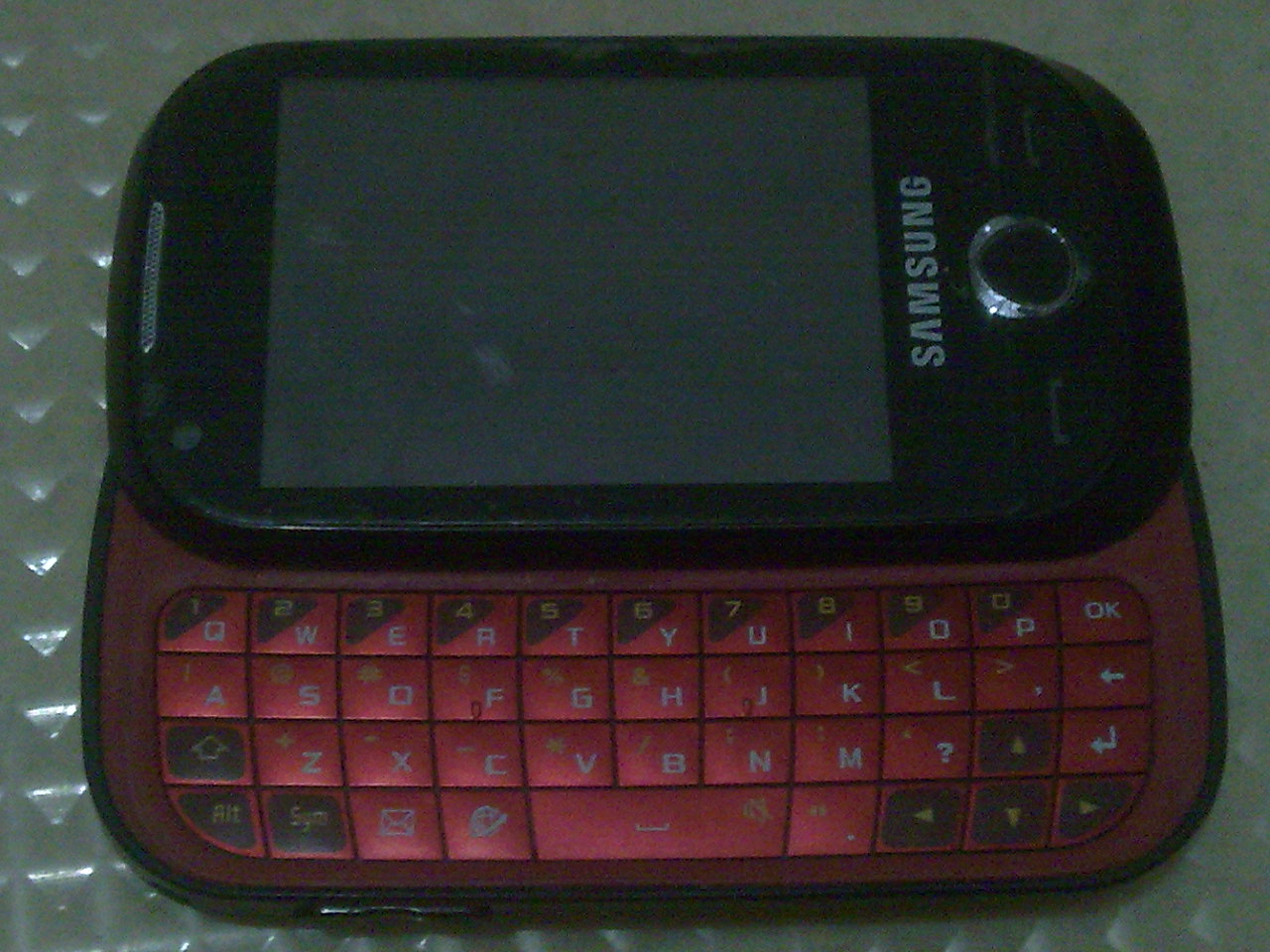
- Manufacturer: Samsung Electronics
- Availability by region: 2009
- Related: Samsung Corby Classic
- Weight: 135 g (5 oz)
- Removable storage: 16 GB
- Battery: Li-Ion 960 mAh
- Rear camera: 3.15 MP
- Display: 240 × 320 pixels
- External display: 2.8 inches
- Connectivity: Wi-Fi, Bluetooth 2.1, 3G
- Data inputs: QWERTY keyboard

Samsung GT-B5310 is a type of Corby mobile phone, also known as Samsung Genio Slide or Samsung Corby Pro and was released in 2009. It was manufactured by Samsung Electronics. Later it was released for Canada, named GT-B5310R, and it was available through Rogers Wireless.

== Outlook ==
The mobile has a mass of 135g. This mobile has the feature of QWERTY keyboard in it. It is shiny with a black panel. Version with AZERTY keyboard exists also.

== Features ==
The display is 240 × 320 pixels, (2.8 inches). The capability of its Phone-book is 1000 Contacts. The memory card capacity is till 16 GB. It also supports WI-FI.

=== Camera ===
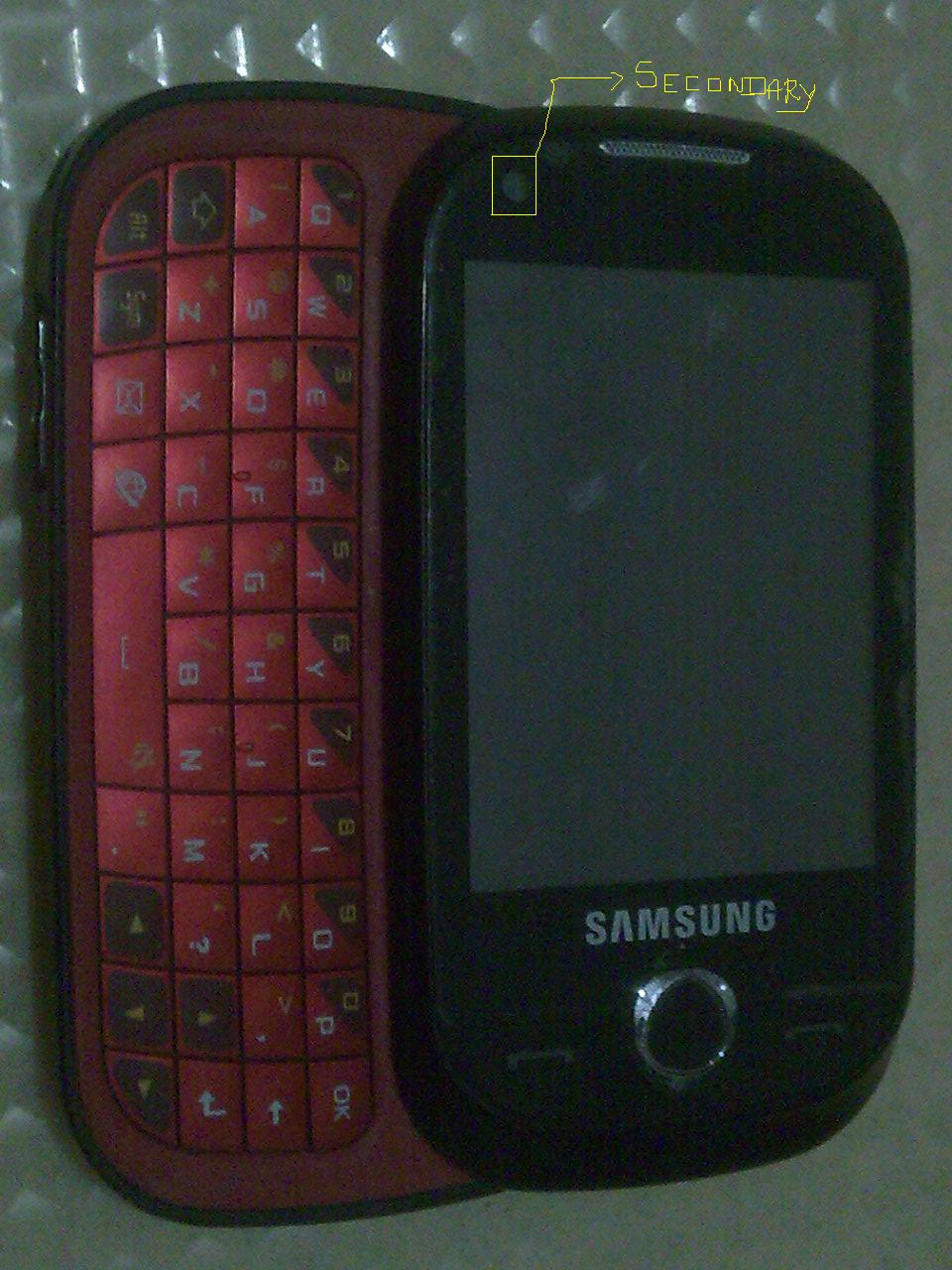
Secondary camera is on left top of the display

- Primary : 3.15 MP, 2048 ×1536 pixels, video.
- Features : Geo-tagging, Smile detection, Panorama
- Video :320 × 240 pixels, QVGA@15fps.
- Secondary: available.
