= Samsung Corby =

Cell smartphone model

Samsung S3650 Genio Touch

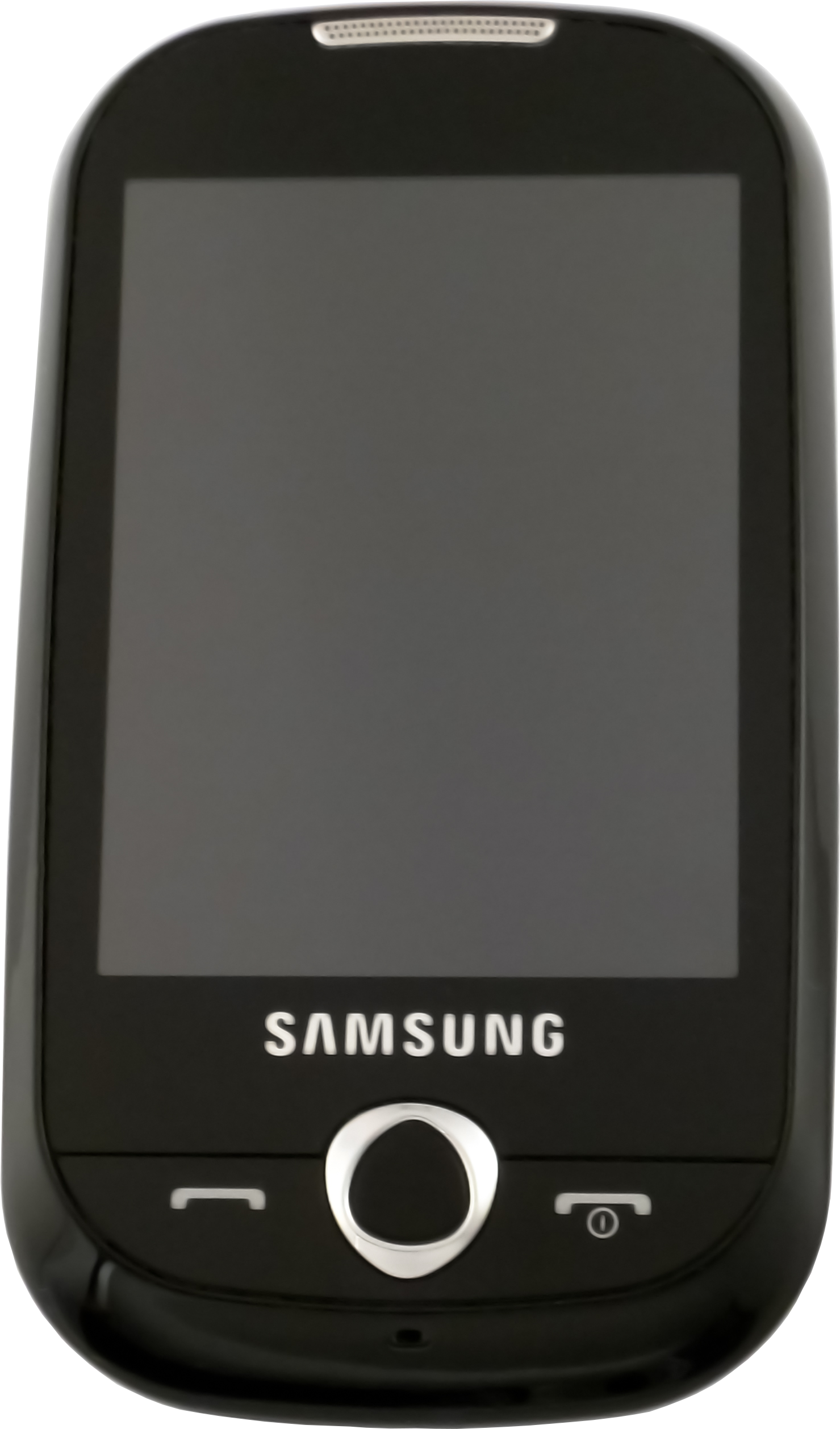
- Manufacturer: Samsung Mobile
- Series: S-Series
- Availability by region: August 2009
- Predecessor: Samsung Tocco
- Successor: Samsung Corby II (S3850)
- Related: Samsung Omnia; Samsung Tocco; Samsung Tocco Ultra Edition; Samsung Galaxy 5 Samsung Lindy (M5650)
- Compatible networks: GSM 850/900/1800/1900
- Form factor: Candybar
- Dimensions: 103×56.5×12 mm (4.06×2.22×0.47 in)
- Weight: 93.5 g (3 oz)
- Operating system: Samsung Touchwiz 1.0
- System-on-chip: Broadcom BCM21331
- CPU: 208 MHz ARM9
- Memory: 50 MB
- Removable storage: Micro SD, up to 8 GB
- Battery: Li-lon 1000 mAh
- Rear camera: 2 megapixel
- Display: 240 × 320 pixels (~143 ppi pixel density) capacitive touchscreen
- External display: 2.8 inches
- Media: MP3, AAC, AAC+, e-AAC+, WMA, AMR, WAV, MP4
- Connectivity: Bluetooth 2.1 and USB 2.0
- Other: Haptic Touch feedback

Samsung S3650 (also known as Genio Touch and formally Samsung Corby) is an entry-level touchscreen smartphone that was released in August 2009 by Samsung. It has a 2 MP camera and a 2.8-inch capacitive TFT touch screen.

There is also a QWERTY and a QWERTY slide version of the phone, Samsung B3210 and Samsung B5310, respectively.

The phone is available in four different colours (limited for rear covers and side mechanical buttons) - White, Pink, Orange or Yellow.

The Samsung GT-S3650W is a variant which has built-in Wi-Fi support.

== Features ==
- Quad-band GSM/EDGE
- 2.8-inch capacitive TFT touchscreen of QVGA resolution
- 50 MB onboard storage, microSD card slot (up to 8 GB)
- 2-megapixel fixed-focus camera with smile detection, QVGA@15fps video recording
- FM radio with RDS
- Find Music recognition service
- TouchWiz and Cartoon UI
- Social networking integration with direct file uploads
- Bluetooth 2.1 with A2DP, USB v.2.0
- Office document viewer
- Smart unlock
- Interchangeable rear covers
- Java-enabled Games
- Photo contact

== Corby in South Korea ==
When the Samsung Corby was released in South Korea, Samsung Electronics changed its specification:

- The original Bluetooth Version was 2.1+EDR, the Korean model's Bluetooth version was downgraded to 2.0+EDR.
- While the original Corby can play non-DRM MP3 files, the Korean version is restricted to only playing with DRM.
- The Korean Corby does not have an office document viewer.
- The Korean Corby does not support MP3/WAV ringtones, just MA5 or MMF ringtones.
- The Korean Corby display is upgraded from a 2.8" QVGA to 3.0" WQVGA.
- The Korean Corby supports T-DMB television.

The price in Korea was high, the equivalent of 394.42 GBP. The model's main rivals are the LG Pep and the Nokia XpressMusic.

In South Korea, boy band 2PM advertised this phone, including a song entitled "My Color".

== See also ==
- Samsung Corby Speed
