= LG Cookie (KP500) =

Touchscreen mobile phone

LG Cookie / CYON Cooky

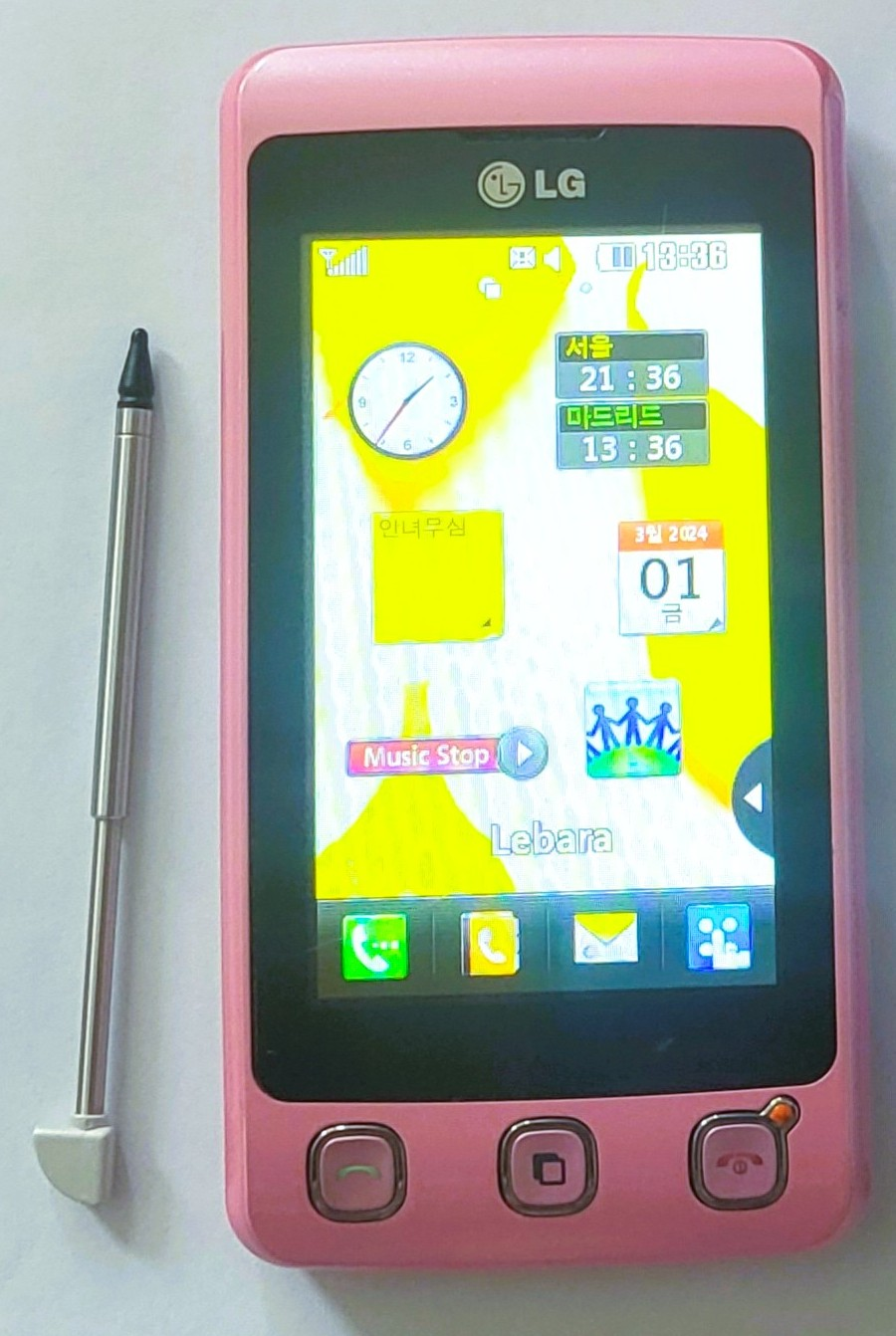
- LG Cookie (KP500) in pink with its stylus
- Manufacturer: LG Electronics
- First released: November 2008; March 9, 2009 (Cooky)
- Compatible networks: GSM 850/900/1800/1900, GPRS, EDGE, CDMA2000-1x, HSDPA & EV-DO (South Korean Cooky)
- Dimensions: 106.5 x 55.4 x 11.9 mm 107.0 x 55.4 x 10.9 mm (South Korean Cooky)
- Weight: 89 g (3 oz); 108 g (South Korean Cooky)
- CPU: Infineon M8877 V2.1 (ARM9E) (32-bit) 175 MHz
- Memory: 47MB
- Removable storage: microSD, up to 16GB
- Battery: Li-ion, 900 mAh
- Rear camera: 3.0 Mega Pixel Fixed-Focus Videos AVI - 320x240 QVGA@30fps XviD + MP3 (decoding)
- Display: 3", 240x400 pixels (~155 ppi pixel density) Resistive Touchscreen
- Connectivity: USB 2.0/Bluetooth 2.1+EDR
- Data inputs: Resistive Touchscreen
- Model: KP500; KP501; KP502; SU910 (SK Telecom); KU9100 (KT); LU9100 (LG Telecom)

The LG KP500 or KP501, marketed as the LG Cookie or as Cyon Cooky (쿠키) in South Korea, is a discontinued touchscreen mobile phone announced on 30 September 2008. LG targeted the entry-level touchscreen market keeping the cost of the Cookie as low as possible by omitting some of the features found on higher-end products, such as 3G. The LG Cookie was highly popular, and is credited for starting the "cheap touchscreen craze".

== Features ==
Its main feature is a 3-inch, 240 x 400 pixel touchscreen, powered by an ARM9E CPU with a clock rate of 175 MHz. It has a 3.15 MP camera capable of capturing still images and MPEG-4 video capture at 12 frame/s, but has no flash module. The LG KP500 Cookie also has an FM radio receiver with RDS and an accelerometer motion sensor with support for auto-rotating display. Software installed on the handset included a document viewer for DOC, XLS, and PDF formats, and a Java MIDP 2.0 games player. The battery is capable of standby time of up to 350 hours and talk time of up to 3 hours 30 minutes.

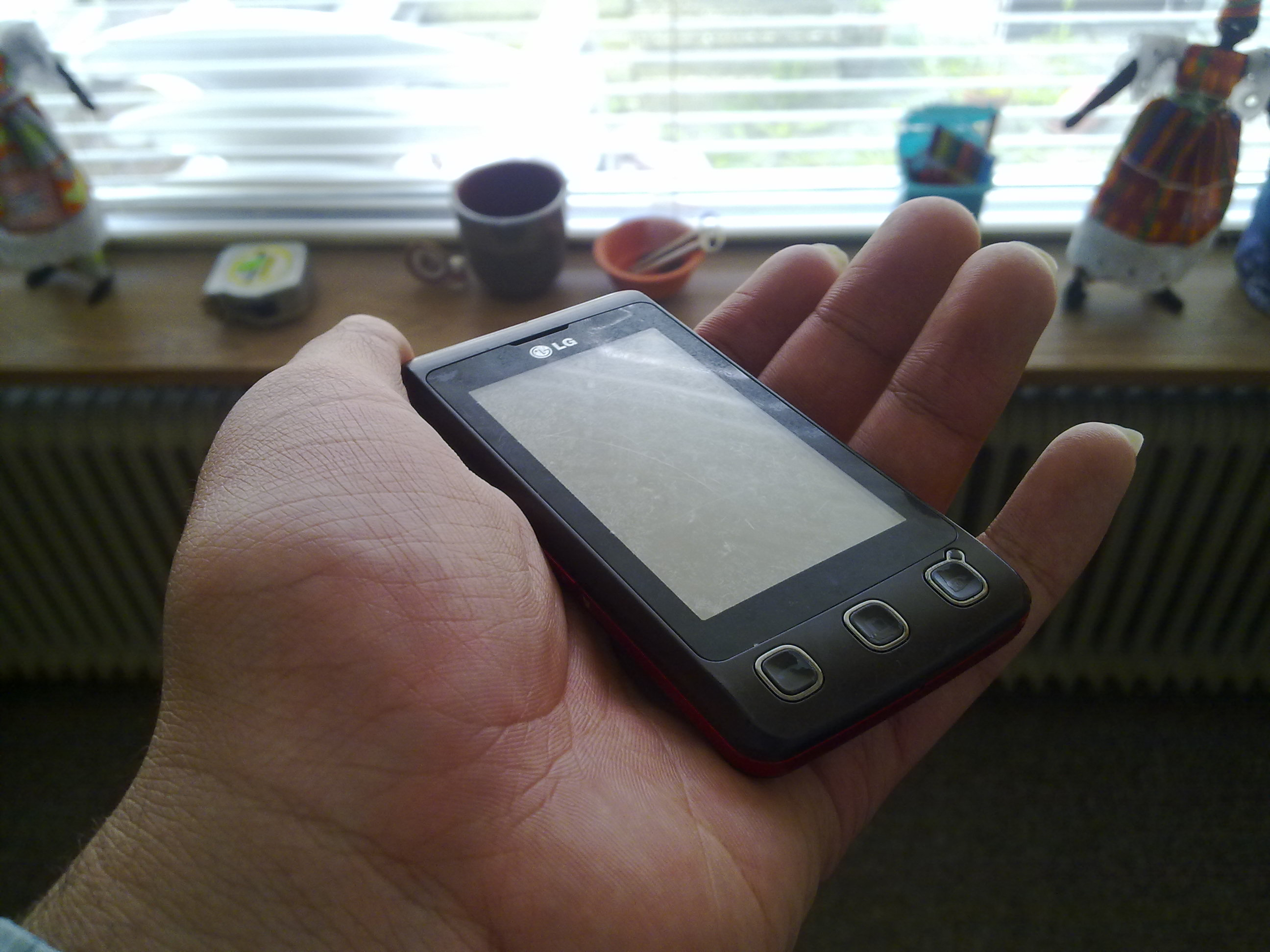
LG Cookie in the hand

The phone was originally released in four colors: Black, Vandyke Brown, Anodizing Silver, and Elegant Gold. This was later increased to ten colors including white, pink and purple.

== Model differences ==
The LG KP501 is a variant of the KP500 with slightly different shaped front buttons and some minor software changes.

The South Korean Cooky model has a slightly different weight and dimension compared to the Cookie.

== Sales and reception ==
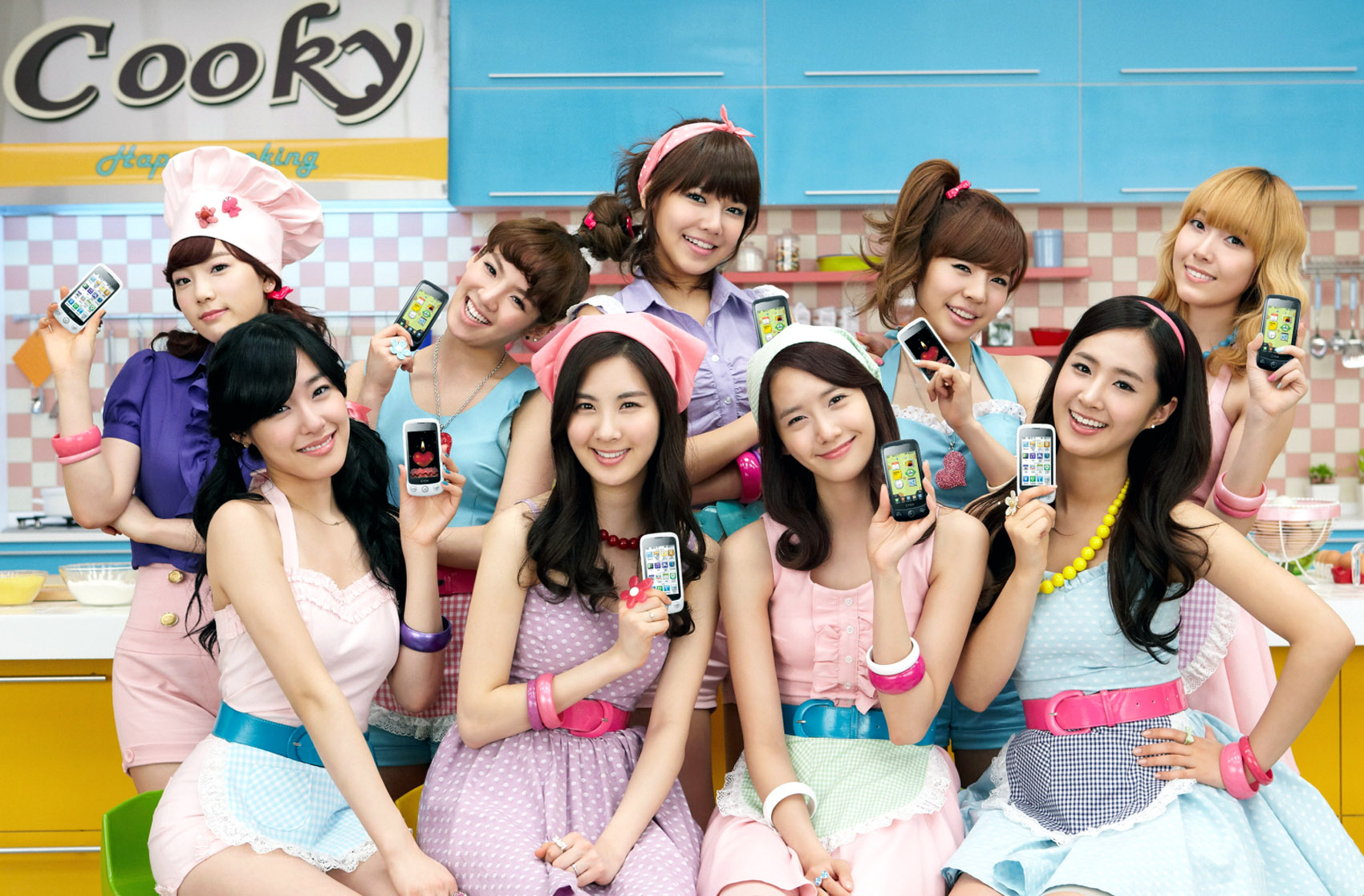
South Korean pop girl group Girls' Generation in an advertisement; the group had performed a commercial film (CF) for the SU920/KU9200 Cooky phone in April 2010

With the Cookie, LG brought a basic and affordable mobile phone but one that included a touchscreen. The Register reviewed it and gave it a score of 70%. GSM Arena in its review wrote that the LG Cookie "simply makes sense", adding that "it doesn't seek to impress but is straightforward, credible and convincing." Softpedia in its review said its best features are its "cheap price and the exceptional look and finishes", with the biggest drawback being difficulty to use in sunlight.

LG Cookie recorded over two million unit sales worldwide in the first five months after its launch in December 2008. It sold 1.2 million units in Europe, 600,000 in Asia and emerging markets, and 100,000 in Korea, where LG claimed that it was the most popular handset as of March 2009. LG planned to expand the Cookie’s availability from 40 to 60 countries as part of its push to hit 13 million in sales worldwide.

In July 2009, LG reported sales of 5 million for the Cookie, making it the company's fastest selling touchscreen phone yet. At the end of the year, LG reported that it had shipped over 10 million units, including over five million in Europe, two million in Latin America and two million in Asia.

At launch, the Cookie was virtually the first basic touchscreen phone on the market. Its popularity led to a swathe of rivals in 2009 offering similar touch phones at low prices, such as Samsung's S5230 Star/Tocco Lite. The LG Cookie's successor, LG Pop, was introduced in late 2009.

== Later LG Cookie models ==
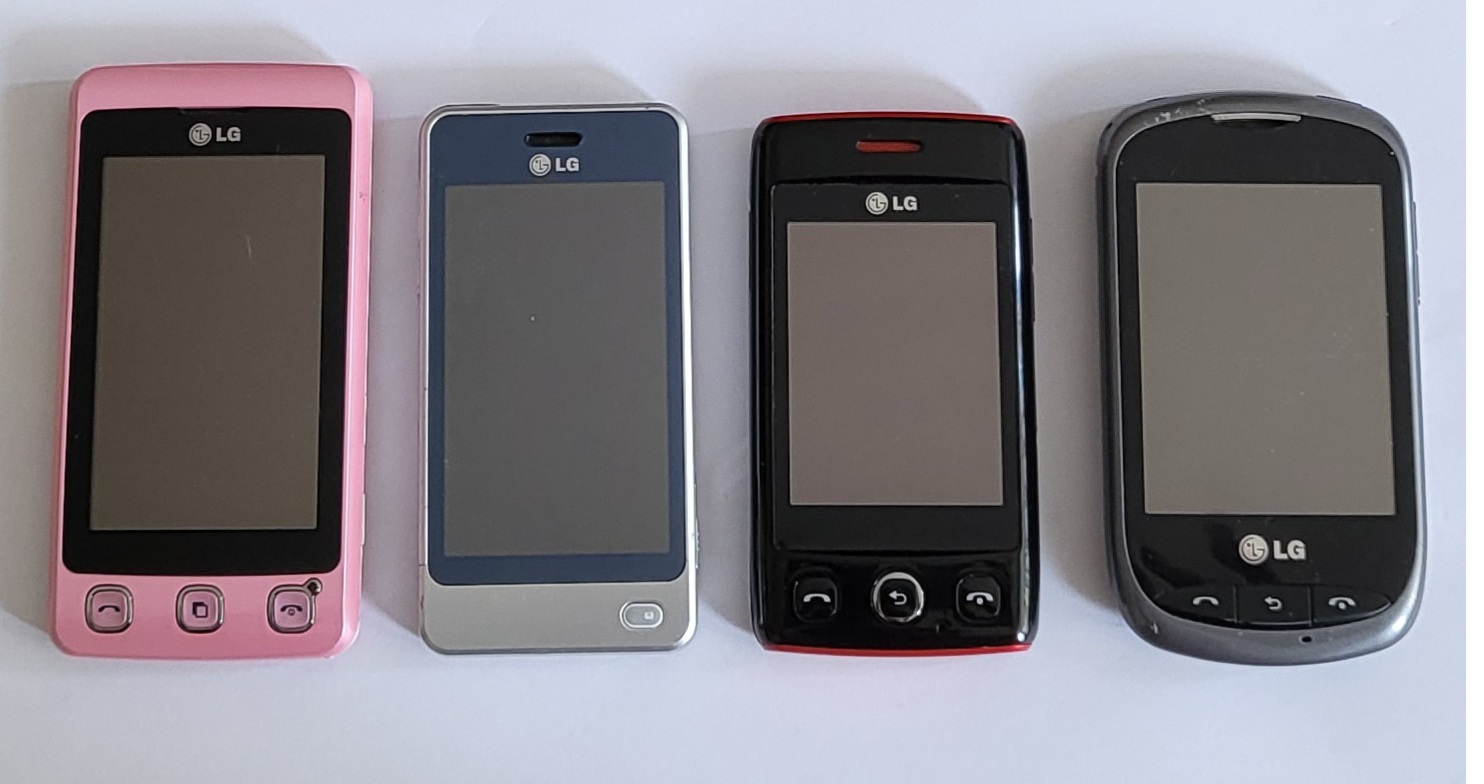
From left to right: LG KP500 (Cookie), LG GD510 (Pop), LG T300 (Cookie Lite), T310 (Cookie Style)

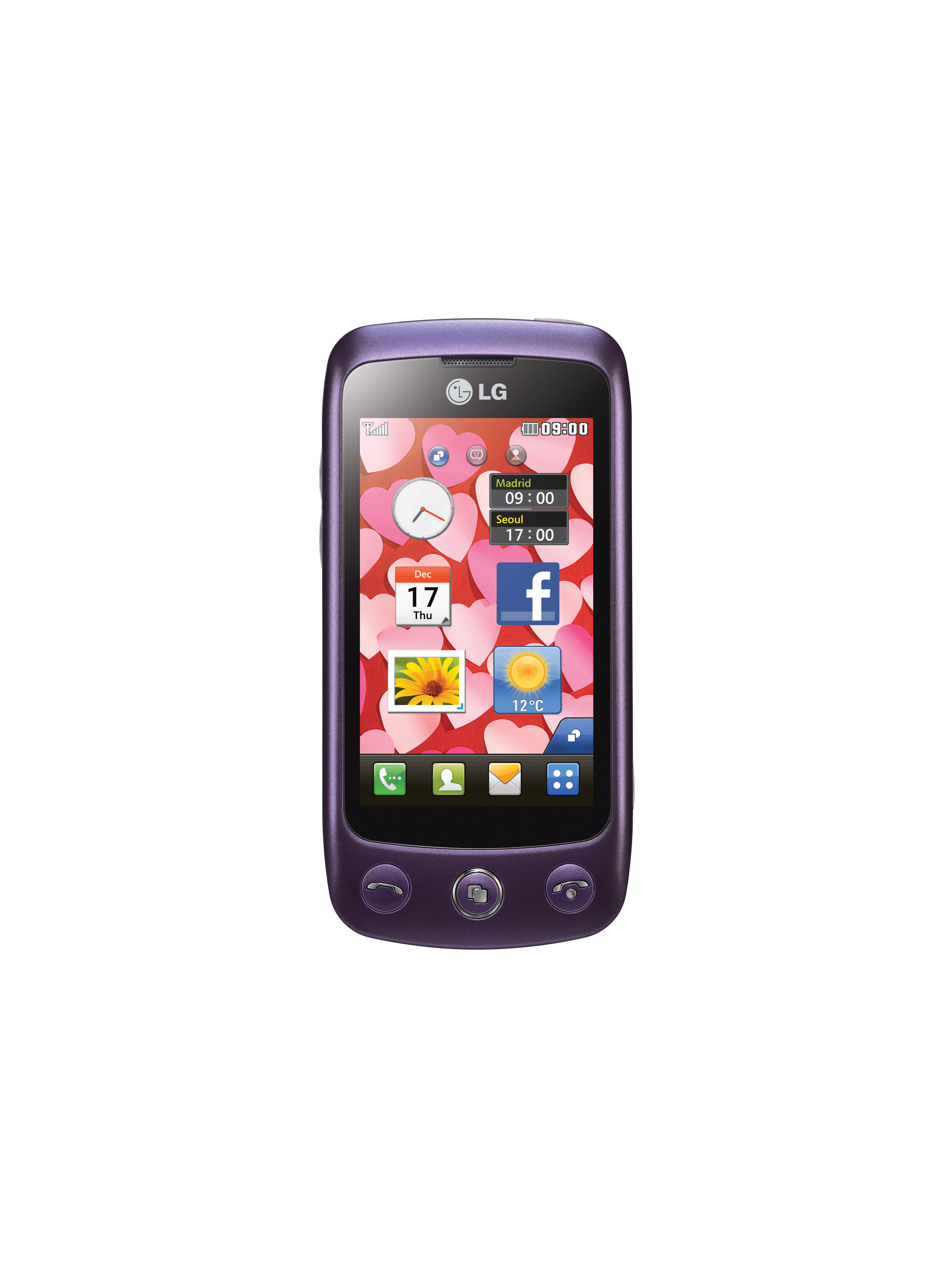
Cookie Plus

After the original LG KP500, the Cookie brand was extended by LG with many more budget phones released in the series, for various different markets.

Model	Name	Year
GD510	Pop (Cookie Pep in India)	2009
GW520	Cookie 3G (also known as Calisto; InTouch Plus)	2009
KM555e	Cookie Wi-Fi (also known as Clubby)	2009
SU920 KU9200	Sosi's Cooky (소시의 쿠키)	2010
GS500	Cookie Plus (also known as Sentio)	2010
GD580	Lollipop (Cookie Flip in India)	2010
GS290	Cookie Fresh	2010
GT350i	Cookie Fresh Wi-Fi (also known as Wink Plus)	2010
KM570	Cookie Gig (also known as Arena II; Cookie Music; Surf)	2010
T300	Cookie Lite (also known as Wink)	2010
T310	Cookie Style (also known as Plum; Wink Style)	2010
T310i	Cookie Wi-Fi	2010
T320	Cookie 3G	2010
C310	Cookie Duet	2010
C375	Cookie Tweet	2011
T515	Cookie Duo (also known as Cookie)	2011
P525	Cookie Dual	2011
T370	Cookie Smart	2012

== See also ==
- LG Chocolate Touch (VX8575)
- LG New Chocolate (BL40)
- LG Crystal (GD900)
- LG Renoir (KC910)
