= Samsung GT-S5230 =

Touch-screen phone released by Samsung in 2009

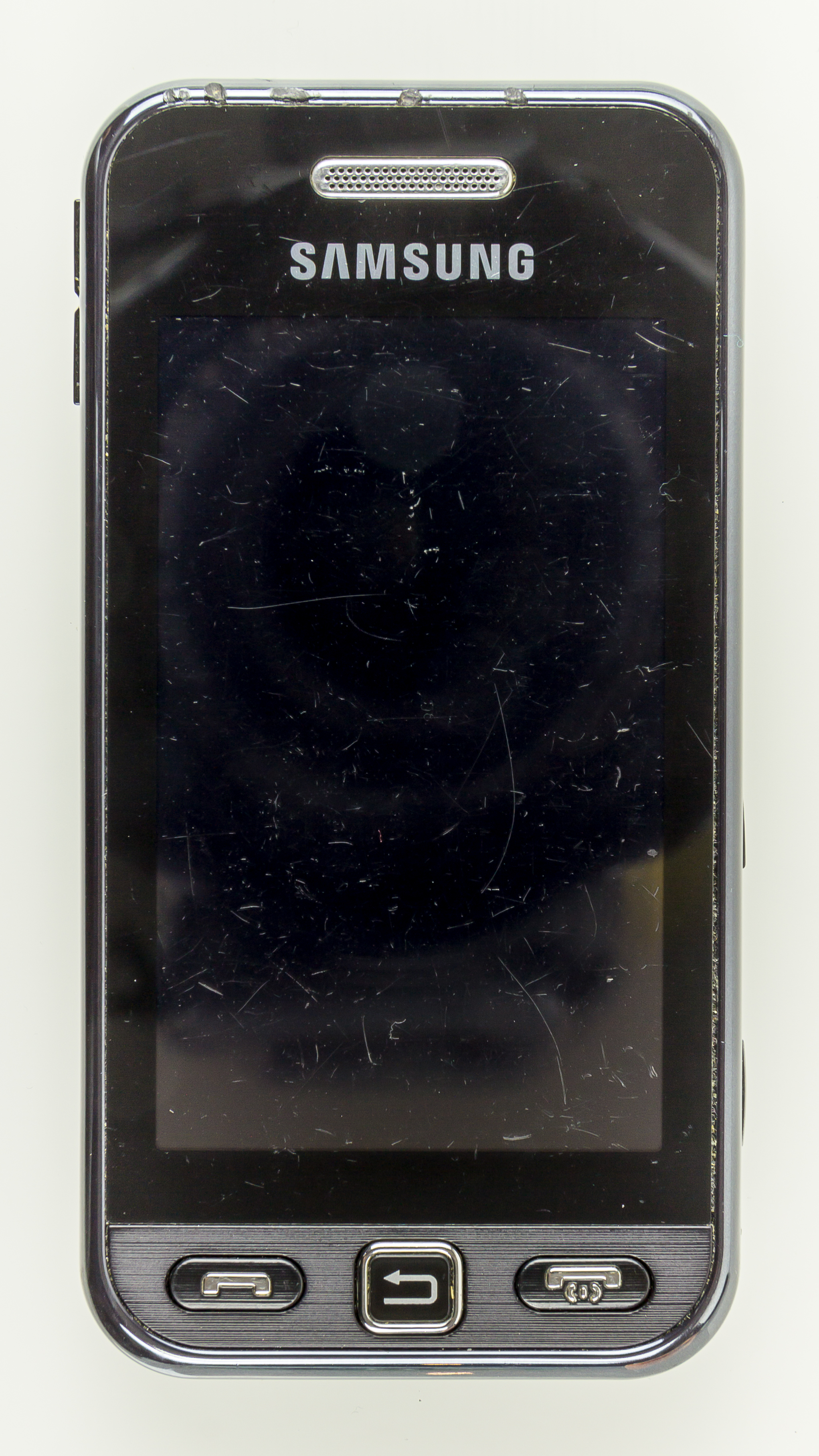
- Manufacturer: Samsung Electronics
- Series: S-Series
- Availability by region: May 2009
- Successor: Samsung Star II (S5260); Samsung i7500
- Related: Samsung F480 Tocco, Samsung S5600 (Preston), Samsung Corby, Samsung Omnia, Samsung Tocco Ultra Edition, Samsung Tocco Lite 2 (S5220)
- Compatible networks: GSM 850/900/1800/1900
- Form factor: Candybar
- Dimensions: 104×53×11.9 mm (4.09×2.09×0.47 in)
- Weight: 93.5 g (3 oz)
- Operating system: Proprietary
- CPU: 208 MHz ARM9 CPU
- Memory: 50/144 MB (Region dependent)
- Removable storage: Micro SD, Micro SDHC, up to 16 GB
- Battery: Li-lon 1000 mAh
- Rear camera: 3.2 Mega Pixel Fixed-Focus Videos AVI - 320x240 QVGA@30fps XviD + MP3 (decoding)
- Display: 240 × 400 pixels (~155 ppi pixel density) Resistive Touchscreen
- External display: 3 inches
- Media: MP3, AAC, AAC+, e-AAC+, WMA, AMR, WAV, 3GP, MP4, AVI
- Connectivity: Bluetooth 2.1, USB 2.0
- Data inputs: T9, Abc
- Other: Touchscreen, Full web browser (Jasmine), Haptic Touch feedback, ringtone: MP3, WAV

Samsung GT-S5230, variously marketed as Tocco Lite, Avila, Samsung Star and Samsung Player One, is an entry-level touchscreen smartphone announced in March 2009 and released in May 2009 by Samsung. It was highly popular as a cheap touch phone, with Samsung reporting sales of 30 million by December 2010.

It is available in black, white, and pink, and there are gold (Virgin Edition Gold) and silver special editions. The phone has a 3.0" LCD with 18-bit color 240 × 400 pixels. In total the device measures 104×53×11.9 mm. It uses a WAP 2.0 browser and makes use of Java MIDP 2.0 as its Java support platform. It uses S3C2410 (CPU) at 200 MHz.

Compared to the previous Samsung F480 Tocco, the S5230 (as its "Lite" name would suggest) is a more budget model with a weaker camera, albeit with a slightly increased display size. It was created in response to the success of the LG Cookie, which offered a full touchscreen phone at a budget price. By default the S5230 does not support a 3G network connection and the base model lacks Wi-Fi connectivity; the S5230W and S5233W variants do support Wi-Fi.

The phone has a 3.2-megapixel camera with video recording, the camera having a smile mode and 4× digital zoom. The phone has software for editing photos and videos and music recognition. Its storage can be upgraded to 16 GB with a microSD card. The UI includes widgets which can display information from the internet. The phone has an inbuilt accelerometer for motion gaming and social networking.

== Full specifications ==
=== Platform ===
- GSM & EDGE 850/900/1800/1900 MHz
- Operating system: Proprietary
- UI: TouchWiz 1.0
- WAP Navigator 2.0, based on WebKit Open Source Project
- Java MIDP 2.0

=== Size ===
- Dimensions: 106 × 53.5 × 11.8 mm
- Weight: 93.5 g

=== External display ===
- 3" TFT LCD, 240 × 400 pixel WQVGA resolution 262K color
- Resistive touchscreen
- Full haptic touchscreen

=== Battery ===
- Li-ion 1000 mAh
- Up to 8 hours talk time
- Up to 300 hours standby time
- Long lasting battery

=== Camera ===
- 3.2-megapixel 2048x1536
- Digital zoom of 4×
- Multiple shot modes; Continuous/Mosaic Shot/Frame shot/Panorama shot/Smile Shot
- Multiple effects; black & white, sepia, negative, watercolour
- Photo editing; frames, text and a small collection of clip art

=== Video ===
- MPEG4/H.263/H.264/AVI/3GP video player
- 30 fps@QVGA video recording
- Video messaging, video streaming
- AVI
- 320×240, bit rate 128 kbit/s

=== Music and sound ===
- Music player
- The following file formats; MP3, AAC, AAC+, e-AAC+, WMA, AMR, WAV
- 3D Sound Technology (DNSe)
- Music library
- Digital rights management (DRM): WMDRM (ILA) OMADRM1.0 OMADRM2.0 (operator dependent)

=== Fun and entertainment ===
- Embedded Java games
- Embedded wallpaper
- Pod casting
- RSS feeds
- FM radio with RDS

=== Office ===
- Document viewer: Yes
- Mobile printing using PictBridge
- Voice mail
- Offline mode

=== Messaging ===
- SMS/MMS
- Email (POP3/SMTP/IMAP4)
- T9 input
- Full QWERTY keyboard when in landscape mode.
- Full AZERTY keyboard when in landscape mode and the T9 language is set in French
- Accelerometer

=== Memory ===
- 102 MB standard
- Up to 16 GB with SD/MC (varies with specific model)
- 2000 phone book entries
- 500 messages (200 inbox, 200 sent, 50 outbox, 50 draft)

=== Call functions ===
- Speakerphone
- Call time management
- Multiparty (conference call)

These specification were provided from Samsung Mobile website.

== Variants ==
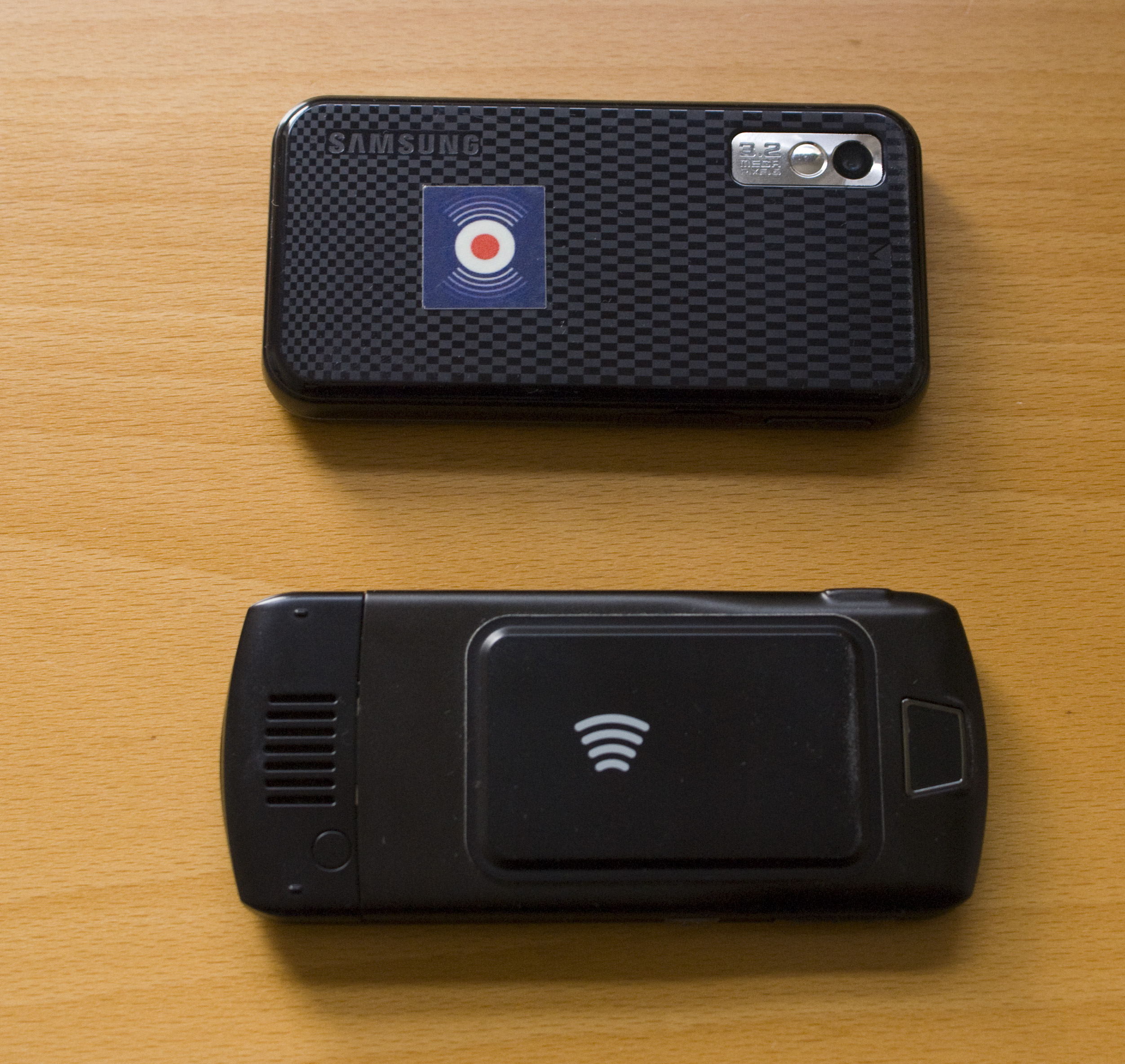
S5230N Star NFC (integrated NFC module) next to a Motorola SLVR L7 (external NFC transponder visible)

- The South African, Indian, Mexican, Brazilian, Russian, Italian, Belgian, Lithuanian, Portuguese and Australian variant is known as Samsung Star. In Poland it is known as Samsung Avila. In Pakistan it is marketed by the name of Samsung GT-S5233A but it is widely known as Samsung Star.
- The S5230G comes with an integrated GPS receiver.
- The phone also comes in another variant known as Samsung S5230W which supports Wi-Fi. It is called Samsung Star Wifi.
- There is also a version of this handset that supports near field communication (NFC), but it is only available on a limited basis for use in NFC trials.

== Box content ==
Standard contents are:

- Phone With Screen guard
- Battery
- Battery charger
- Headphones
