= Samsung S8000 Jet =

Smartphone model

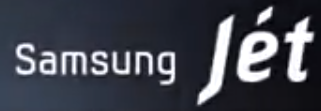

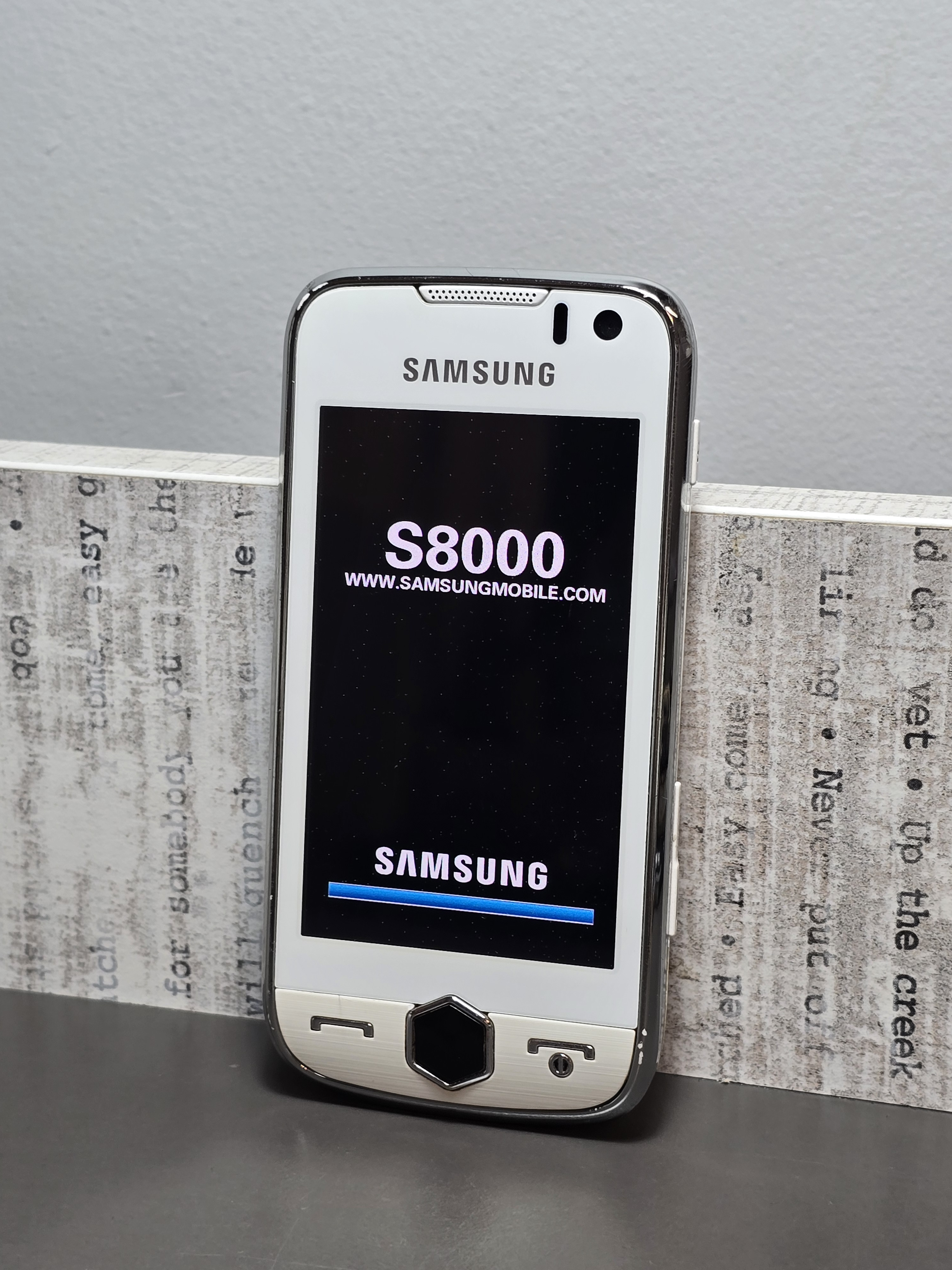
- Also known as: S8003 Jet
- Manufacturer: Samsung Mobile
- Series: S-Series
- First released: June 2009; 17 years ago
- Availability by region: June 2009; 17 years ago
- Successor: Samsung Jet Ultra Edition
- Related: Omnia, Tocco Lite
- Compatible networks: GSM: 850, 900, 1,800, 1,900, and 2,100 MHz; 3G: 900 and 2100 MHz; HSDPA: 3.6 Mbit/s
- Form factor: Bar
- Dimensions: 108.9 mm × 53.5 mm × 11.9 mm (4.29 in × 2.11 in × 0.47 in)
- Weight: 110 g (3.9 oz)
- Operating system: No (using TouchWiz 2.0 interface)
- CPU: 800 MHz Samsung S3C6410 processor (main CPU); Qualcomm MSM6246 (ARM9E) modem SoC
- Storage: 2 GB / 8 GB
- Removable storage: microSDHC up to 32 GB
- SIM: miniSIM
- Battery: Li-ion 1100 mAh
- Rear camera: 5-megapixel, 2,592×1,944 pixels
- Display: 3.1-inch (79 mm) WVGA 800×480 pixels AMOLED resistive touchscreen
- Media: MP3, AAC, AAC+, e-AAC+, WMA, AMR, WAV, MP4, MPEG4, H.263, H.264, WMV, DivX, and XviD
- Connectivity: Wi-Fi (802.11b/g), AGPS, Bluetooth 2.1 with A2DP, and USB 2.0 (microUSB)
- Data inputs: T9, Abc
- Other: Web browser with WAP 2.0/xHTML, and HTML capabilities, and haptic touch feedback

Samsung Jet (S8000) is a mid-range touchscreen smartphone released in June 2009 by Samsung Mobile. It is styled just like the Samsung i8000 Omnia II, but is smaller in size and runs a proprietary Samsung interface. Like the Omnia II (announced at the same time), the Samsung Jet featured an 800 MHz processor, which was faster than most smartphones of the time.

== Specifications ==
- Display: PenTile AMOLED
- Resolution: 16M-color resistive touchscreen of 800 × 480 pixel resolution
- Screen Size: 3.1 inches (7.9 cm)
- Weight: 110 grams (3.9 oz)
- Dimensions: 108.9 mm × 53.5 mm × 11.9 mm (4.29 in × 2.11 in × 0.47 in)
- Talk Time: 8 hours 20 minutes (2G), 5 hours (3G)
- Standby Time: 422 hours (2G), 406 hours (3G)
- Connectivity: HSDPA, Wi-Fi and Bluetooth (A2DP)

== Features ==
The phone features an 800 MHz processor, a 5 MP camera with 480p video recorder, a 3.1-inch resistive touchscreen AMOLED display, A-GPS, FM radio, 2 or 8 GB of internal storage with a microSD slot for an additional 16 GB and a Samsung-developed WebKit-touting web browser. It runs Samsung's TouchWiz 2.0 interface. The videos recorded are at a D1 resolution at 30 fps using a low bitrate 3GP format.

== Android compatibility ==
A group of developers (with some of the Darkforest forum) have managed to run Android on this phone under the project name of JetDroid. However, messaging and calls do not work.
