= Prada (disambiguation) =

Prada is an Italian fashion company.

Prada may also refer to:

== Prada by Prada ==
- LG Prada, 1 (KE850), a mobile phone designed by Prada and manufactured by LG Electronics
- LG Prada II (KF900), a mobile phone designed by Prada and manufactured by LG Electronics
- LG Prada 3.0 (P940), a mobile phone designed by Prada and manufactured by LG Electronics
- Prada Challenge, an America's Cup yachting syndicate sponsored by Prada whose boats are also referred to as "Prada Challenge" or "Prada"
- Prada Transformer, the Prada building in Seoul, South Korea
- Fondazione Prada, an art and culture foundation in Italy

== Places ==
- Prada de Conflent, Catalan name for Prades, Pyrénées-Orientales, Languedoc-Roussillon, France
- Prada (Poschiavo), Val Poschiavo, Grisons, Switzerland
- Château du Prada (built 1764), a chateau in Aquitane, France

== Music ==
- "Prada" (24kGoldn and Lil Tecca song), 2021
- "Prada" (Cassö, Raye and D-Block Europe song), 2023, a remix of "Ferrari Horses"

== Other uses ==
- Prada (surname)
- Prada (skipper), a genus of butterflies
- Prada Elementary School, Webb County, Texas, USA

== See also ==
- The Devil Wears Prada (disambiguation)
- Pradal serey, a Khmer form of kickboxing
- Prado, an art museum in Madrid, Spain
- Prade, Littoral, Slovenia
