= LG Venus =

Mobile phone model

LG VX8800/KF600 (Venus)
- Manufacturers: LG Electronics (Canada) Telus Mobility
- Availability by region: November 19, 2007 (VX8800); March 2008 (KF660)
- Predecessor: LG Chocolate
- Dimensions: 4.00" (H) x 2.00" (W) x 0.62" (D)
- Weight: 3.79 oz (107 g)
- Memory: 60 MB for music
- Removable storage: up to 8 GB microSD (not included)
- Battery: Li – Ion, 800 mAH
- Rear camera: 2.0 megapixels
- Display: Color TFT TouchScreen 240 x 320 pixels (262.144 colors)
- Connectivity: Bluetooth
- Hearing aid compatibility: M3

LG Venus (model no. LG VX8800 (CDMA) or LG KF600 (GSM)) is a slider cell phone by LG Electronics. The phone has two screens: a regular one as well as a unique touchscreen pad on the bottom third of the front (called "InteractPad") which changes to suit the activity currently being done on the phone. It features a music player, Bluetooth capabilities, up to an 8 GB microSD slot, video messaging, speaker phone and voice command, among other features. It is considered by many to be a spiritual successor to LG's popular "Chocolate" line, which includes the previous LG Chocolate (VX8500) and LG Chocolate Spin (VX8550) handsets.

As part of the VX series, the VX8800 LG Venus was sold exclusively to Verizon Wireless in the United States. Pre-ordering began on November 8, 2007, and the release date for Verizon Wireless was November 19, 2007. On March 27, 2008, Telus Mobility announced that it would be made available through their stores and retail partners around mid-April. The GSM version of the Venus is the LG KF600, announced January 16, 2008 and released in March. It has an improved, 3.2-megapixel camera up from 2.0-megapixel on the VX8800.

== See also ==
- Samsung U900 Soul
- Samsung E950
- Sony Ericsson W580
- LG Shine
