= LG KG320 =

Cell phone model

LG Aegis (MG320) LG Chocolate bar (KG320)
- Compatible networks: GSM 900/1800/1900 or GSM 850/1800/1900, GPRS
- Dimensions: 96×46×9.9 mm (3.78×1.81×0.39 in)
- Memory: 128 MB
- Display: 176×220 pixel TFT LCD

LG MG320 or KG320 (for Europe) is a GSM Tri-Band mobile phone manufactured and sold by LG Electronics. The LG Aegis is a 'candy-bar' style phone and is part of the 2007 line up of the LG Malo. The phone has received some criticism for its lack of external memory support.

== Features ==
- Talk time: up to 3 hours
- Standby time: up to 8 days
- Dimensions: 96 mmx46 mmx99 mm.
- Bands: GSM 900/1800/1900 or GSM 850/1800/1900 MHz
- GPRS : Class 10 (2U/4D)
- Display: TFT, 262K colours, 176 x 220 resolution
- Memory: 128 MB internal
- Camera: 1.3-megapixel.
- Multimedia playback: MP3, AMR, MID, MIDI, WMA, AAC, 3GP
- Digital Right Management
- Java support: MIDP 2.0, CLDC 1.1
- Local connectivity: Bluetooth v2.0 + EDR (supports A2DP), USB v2.0

== LG mobile line up ==
The Aegis (MG320) is part of the line up of LG Electronics, this line up also include the LG Shine, LG Prada (KE850), LG Dimple, LG DarkHorse

== Specifications ==
Type	Specification
Modes	GSM 900 / GSM 1800 / GSM 1900 or GSM 850/ GSM 1800/ GSM 1900
Dimensions	96 x 46 x 9.9 mm
Form Factor	Candy-bar
Battery Life	Talk: 3.50 hours Standby: 200 hours
Battery Type	LiIon 600 mAh
Display	Type: LCD (Color TFT/TFD) Colors: 262,144 Size: 176 x 220 pixels
Platform / OS	(N/A)
Memory	128 MB Multimedia Memory
Phone Book Capacity	1000
Bluetooth	class 2
Camera	Resolution: 1280 x 960
Custom Ringtones	supports MP3 / WMA / ACC format
EMS / Picture Messaging	EMS 5.0
High-Speed Data	Technology: GPRS class 10
Java ME	Version: MIDP 2.0
Text Messaging	2-Way: Yes
USB	USB connector
Wireless Internet	WAP 2.0
Alarm	Yes
Calculator	Yes
Calendar	Yes
Custom Graphics	Yes
Data-Capable	Yes
Digital TTY/TDD	Yes
Games	Yes
MMS	Yes
Multiple Languages	Yes
Multiple Numbers per Name	Yes
PC Sync	Yes
Picture ID	Yes
Polyphonic Ringtones	Yes
Ringer ID	Yes
Side Keys	Yes
Speaker Phone	Yes
Text Messaging Templates	Yes
Vibrate	Yes

== See also ==
- LG Electronics
- LG Cyon
