= LG Black Label Series =

Series of mobile phones manufactured by LG Electronics

Black Label Series is a discontinued line of mobile phones created by LG Electronics. The series consists of highly fashionable products and was started with the LG Chocolate.

The mobile phones released in this series were:

- CYON Chocolate - November 2005; LG Chocolate (KG800) - April 2006
  LG Chocolate Platinum (KE800) - October 2006
- LG Shine (KE970) - January 2007
- LG Secret (KF750) - May 2008
- LG New Chocolate (BL40) - 2009
  LG New Chocolate (BL20) - October, 2009
