= LG Secret (KF750) =

Cell phone model

LG Secret (KF750) / CYON Secret (SU600/KU6000/LU6000)

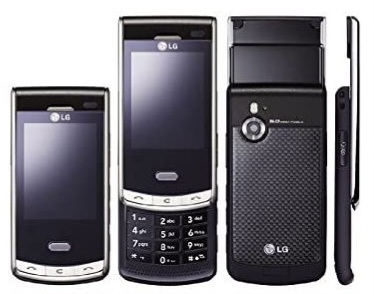
- Manufacturer: LG Electronics
- Series: Black Label Series
- First released: 2008; 18 years ago
- Availability by region: Europe May 3, 2008, South Korea June 30, 2008
- Predecessor: LG Shine
- Related: Official Secret Website
- Compatible networks: GSM 900/1800/1900; HSDPA/UMTS
- Form factor: Slider
- Dimensions: 102.8×50.8×11.8 mm (4.05×2.00×0.46 in)
- Weight: 116 g (4 oz)
- Operating system: Java MIDP 2.0
- Memory: 100 MB Internal
- Removable storage: MicroSD (TransFlash), up to 8 GB
- Battery: 800mAh Li-Ion
- Rear camera: 5.0 megapixels Autofocus; Schneider-Kreuznach; Macro Mode; Face detection
- Display: 240 x 320, 2.4" Display; 262K-color TFT LCD
- Connectivity: Bluetooth V 2.0; USB; 3G; GPRS; HSDPA 3.6 Mbit/s
- Model: KF750

The LG Secret (a.k.a. LG KF750) is a 3G slider-style mobile phone manufactured by LG Electronics. It is the third phone in LG's "Black Label Series", following the LG Chocolate and LG Shine. It was released on May 3, 2008 in Europe. It has a 5.0-megapixel camera and Neon touch navigation, and is notable for incorporating these in a slim slider form design.

It also was released in Japanese market by NTT Docomo under the name L-01A, but it has a largest screen (at least 2.8 inch WQVGA), also has a 1seg TV tuner, and has a physical navigation keypad rather than touch navigation keypad.

== Design ==
The phone is black, with the battery cover made of carbon fiber. The front display is shielded with tempered glass. The top of the phone is covered with synthetic leather. The phone also features mechanical Send, End and Cancel buttons, addressing a complaint that some users had with previous LG phones. Although the device is marketed as a fashion style mobile, its hardware is on par with many feature mobiles on the market at the time of launch.

== Features ==
At the time of its release, the phone was the world's slimmest 5.0-megapixel camera phone. It records video in VGA @ 30fps and QVGA @ 120fps and "time lapse videos". the QVGA videos are recorded in 120fps and then saved at 15fps. this enables slow motion videos. The videos are recorded with divx encoding which balances quality with file size.

It comes with a LED flash, which despite not being a xenon flash, functions well in dim lighting for objects up to 2 meters away. the phone also has support for divx videos. LG Secret comes with an accelerometer, which auto-adjusts the phone's display based on the orientation of the phone. The phone also comes with accelorometer games. The LG Secret comes with Auto Luminance Control which automatically adjusts screen brightness according to ambient brightness.

== Price ==
The phone was sold in the UK market at launch for £339.95.

== See also ==
- LG Viewty
- LG Vu
- LG Renoir
- LG Cookie
- LG Voyager
- LG KS360
