= Prada (surname) =

Prada is a Spanish surname. Notable people with the surname include:

- Adolfo Prada (1883–1962), Spanish army officer
- Ágatha Ruiz de la Prada (born 1960), Spanish fashion designer
- Alberto Prada (born 1989), Spanish footballer
- Ana Prada (born 1971), Uruguayan singer-songwriter
- Bruno Prada (born 1971), Brazilian sailor
- Carlos Prada Sanmiguel (1939–2013), Colombian priest
- Claire Prada (born 1962), French applied mathematician and acoustician
- Federico Richter Fernandez-Prada (1922–2011), Peruvian priest
- Gustavo Baz Prada (1894–1987), Mexican politician
- Inés Del Río Prada (born 1958), Spanish terrorist
- Jaya Prada (born 1962), Indian film actress and politician
- Jean Carlos Prada (born 1984), Venezuelan welterweight boxer
- Jesús Capitán Prada (born 1977), Spanish footballer
- Joaquín Prada (born 1991), Uruguayan rugby footballer
- José María Prada (1925–1978), Spanish actor
- Manuel González Prada (1844–1918), Peruvian politician
- Mara Prada (fl. 2010s), Columbia singer on "Crazy Love" with Beto Pérez
- Mario Prada (died 1958), Italian fashion designer and founder of PRADA
- Michel Prada (born 1940), French lawyer
- Miuccia Prada (born 1949), Italian fashion designer and part of PRADA
- Pedro Richter Prada (1921–2017), Peruvian politician
- Pedro Pablo Prada Quintero, Cuban diplomat
- Raúl Prada, Bolivian philosopher
- Renato Prada Oropeza (1937–2011), Bolivian-Mexican scientist
- Silvia Prada (born 1969), Spanish artist

== See also ==
- Prada (disambiguation)
