= LG Chocolate Spin (VX8550) =

Feature phone manufactured by LG Electronics

LG Chocolate 2 (VX8550)
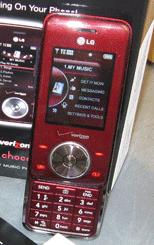
- First released: July 2007
- Availability by region: US - June 7, 2007; Canada - June 7, 2007
- Discontinued: August 2008
- Predecessor: LG Chocolate (VX8500)
- Successor: LG Chocolate 3
- Compatible networks: CDMA
- Form factor: slider feature phone
- Dimensions: 3.85" (h) x 1.87" (w) x 0.67" (d)
- Weight: 3.24 oz (92 g)
- Memory: 72 MB (Internal)
- Display: LCD 240 x 320 pixels (262000 colors)
- Connectivity: Bluetooth / USB Cable

The LG Chocolate 2 (VX8550) (also known as the VX8550 or the LG Chocolate Spin) was the second of four versions of the LG Chocolate series mobile phone sold in North America. The device was manufactured from July 2007 to August 2008 for sale by Verizon Wireless in the United States and Telus in Canada. The device was sold in four colors: black, black cherry (red), blue mint (blue), and ice blue (light blue). The model was discontinued with the unveiling of the LG Chocolate 3 in August 2008.

== Features ==
Some of the features of the device include:

- Touch controls with vibrational feedback
- Navigational wheel
- Lock button on side
- Music button on side
- Microphone button on side
- 1.3-megapixel camera
- Micro SD slot

== GetItNow application disabled ==
Verizon notified its users of this and many other "older" phones that unless they accessed the GetItNow function of their phones prior to March 25 of 2011 and installed a critical update, they would never be able to use any of the GetItNow applications (including the backup assistant) again. After March 25, the update became unavailable— Verizon was the sole source of this update.

== See also ==
- Verizon Wireless
- LG Chocolate (VX8500)
- LG Chocolate (VX8560)
