= LG Incite =

Smartphone model

- Manufacturer: LG Electronics
- Availability by region: November 2008 for AT&T; February 2009 (for both SK and KT)
- Operating system: Windows Mobile 6.1 Professional
- CPU: Qualcomm MSM7201A ARM Processor at 528 MHz
- Rear camera: 3.2 megapixel AF back
- Display: 240x400 px, 3.0 in (76 mm), 262K, 18-bit color LCD
- Data inputs: Touchscreen

The LG Incite is an Internet-enabled Windows Mobile Pocket PC smartphone designed and marketed by LG of Korea.

This phone has a reflective screen like the LG Shine but the difference is the chrome coated plastic

== Product details ==
=== Hardware ===
- Display : 3" Touch screen
  - Resolution (pixels) : 240 x 400 wQVGA display
  - Colors : 262K
- Keyboard : Touchscreen QWERTY On Screen, LG-Key On Screen
- Camera : 3.2MP Resolution, Live video capture and playback is also supported

=== Software ===
- Operating System : Windows Mobile 6.1 Professional
  - Windows Media Player Mobile 10 Installed
    - Supported music formats : MP3 +AAC + eAAC+. EAAC+ WMA, WAV
- Streaming Radio
  - XM Satellite Radio, Pandora(for CT810, excluded in KU and SU series)
  - Built-in FM Radio with RDS
- SMS and MMS Service : Available to send Pictures and Videos.
- Mobile Email
  - Microsoft Direct Push
- Web browser
- Built-in Calendar, Alarm clock, Call Waiting, Caller ID, Personal Organizer(LG Today Application)
- Address book
- Call Forwarding
- Multitasking
- Use voice and data simultaneously

== Carrier supports ==
=== AT&T ===
- AT&T Mobile Music
- MusicID - Identify songs you're listening to
- Instant Messaging (IM) that supports AOL, Yahoo!, & Windows Live Messenger
- Xpress Mail - access work and personal email, including Microsoft Outlook, Lotus Notes, Yahoo! Mail, AOL, Windows Live and more
- MEdia(TM) Net for wireless internet access
- CV - news, sports, weather, entertainment and more
- MEdia(TM) Mall

=== SK Telecom ===
- SK Telecom Total Message Service Application(kr:통합메세지함)
- Nate(include mPlayOn) : WIPI - A Java-like VM for Most Korean Handheld Device
- MySmart : SK Telecom's Mobile AppStore
- Sync Mail : Push Mail Application

=== KT ===
- SHOW(include SHOW Download Pack) : Like Nate, This app is also WIPI VM.
- WebSurfing : Pull style Web Browser

== Technical specifications ==
=== Battery ===
- Battery Type : 1300 mAh Lithium-ion polymer
- Talk time : Up to 8.7 hours
- Standby time : 21 days

=== Dimensions ===
- Weight : 4.23 ounces
- Size (inches) : 4.21 x 2.2 x 0.55 inches
- (millimeters) : 106.9 x 55.88 x 13.97mm

=== Memory ===
- Internal memory storage : 256 MB ROM, 128 MB RAM
- Expandable memory storage : 32 GB
- Memory format : microSD(TM)

=== Support Connection ===
- Wi-Fi IEEE 802.11 b/g
- 3G UMTS/HSDPA Tri-Band(850/1900/2100Mhz)
- GSM Quad-band(850/900/1800/1900Mhz) with EDGE(High Speed Data Network)
- Bluetooth (Version 2.0 with EDR)
- Micro USB
- (for Only CT-810) Qualcomm A-GPS

== See also ==
- List of LG mobile phones
