= LG New Chocolate (BL40) =

Smartphone model

LG BL40 (New Chocolate)

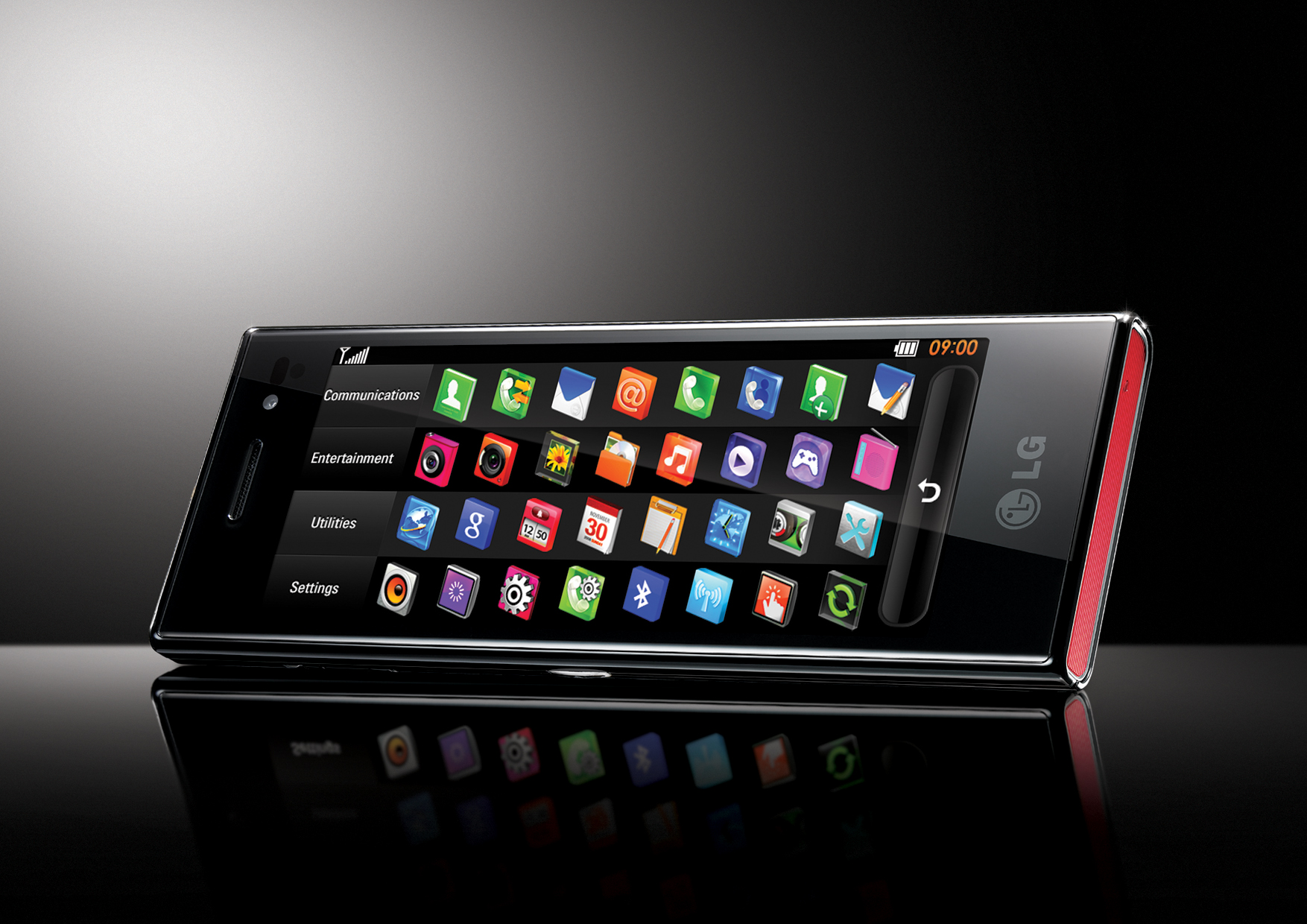
- The BL40 New Chocolate
- Manufacturer: LG
- Series: LG Chocolate
- Compatible networks: HSDPA (3.5G), Quad band GSM / GPRS
- Form factor: candybar
- Connectivity: Bluetooth, WLAN

The LG BL40, branded as the New Chocolate, is a touchscreen mobile phone from the South Korean electronics company LG. The BL40, along with the non-touchscreen slider LG BL20, were both designed to resemble the original LG Chocolate. Both the New Chocolate models were introduced on 3 August 2009 and were released in to market in Europe and Asia.

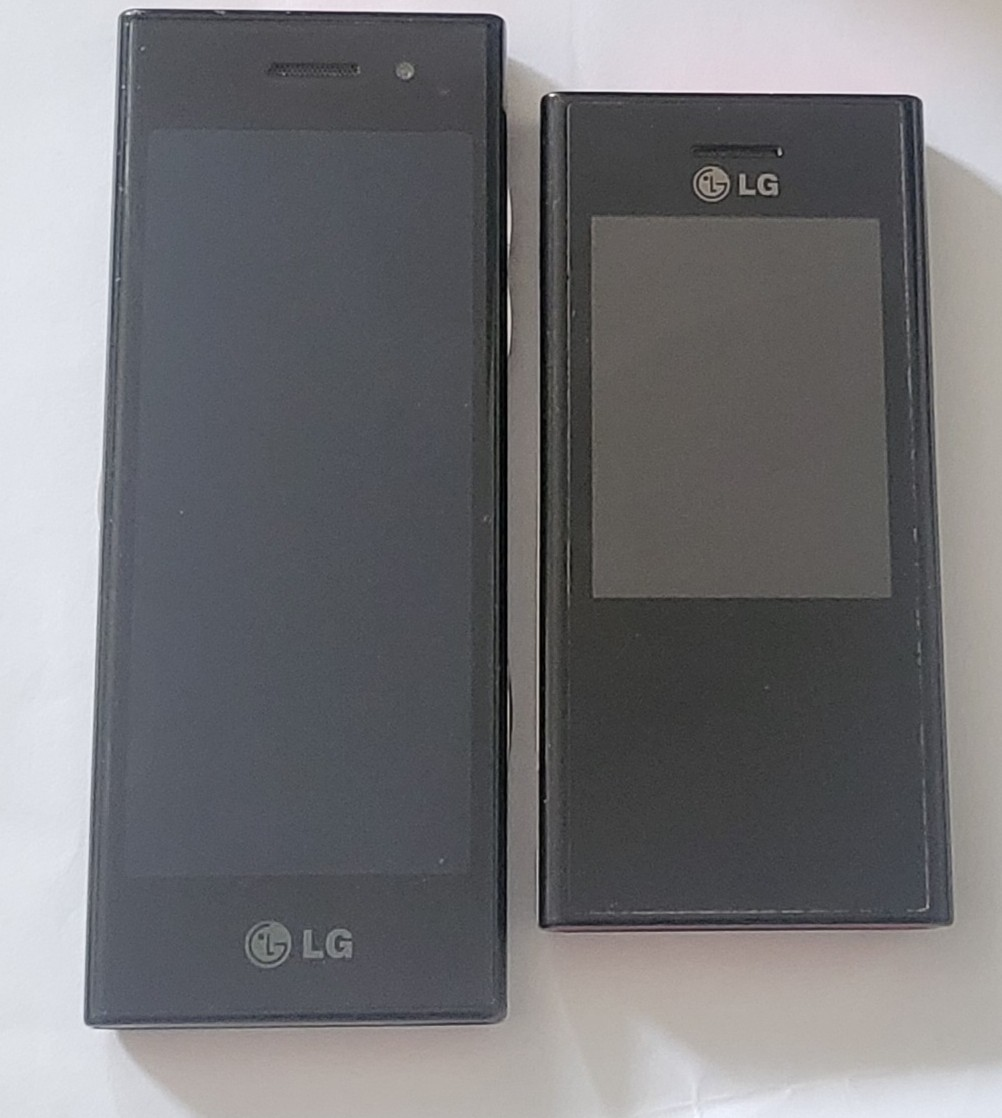
The LG New Chocolate range: LG BL40 (left) and LG BL20 (right)

The BL40 New Chocolate showcases a distinctive design, incorporating a 4-inch display that pioneers a wide aspect ratio of 21:9, a first in the history of mobile phones. It runs LG's own proprietary operating system and presents the renowned S-Class 3D user interface, which was initially introduced on the LG Arena.

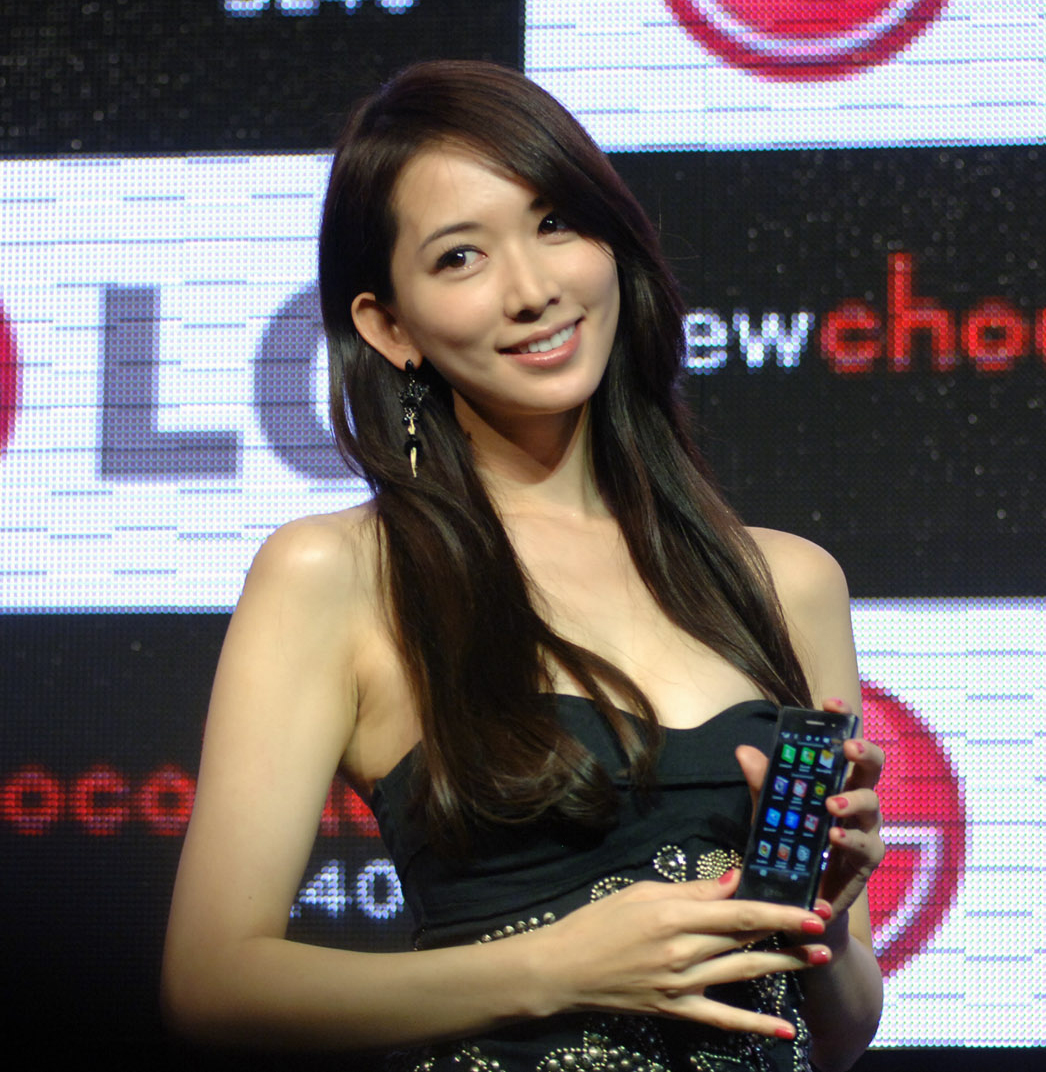
Actress and model Lin Chi-ling at the LG New Chocolate (BL40) phone launching event in 2009, Hong Kong

It is tri-band with HSDPA support. Its camera is a 5-megapixel f/2.8 with a Schneider Kreuznach Tessar lens, (as seen previously on LG Renoir, LG Viewty and others). It has 335 MB internal storage but has MicroSD expandable storage for up to 32 GB extra. There's also Wi-Fi, an accelerometer, and an FM transmitter.

== Links ==
- LG Chocolate BL40
