= LG Viewty =

Smartphone model

LG Viewty / CYON 뷰티폰
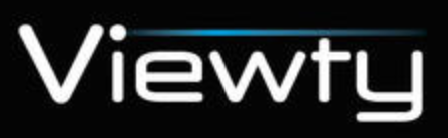

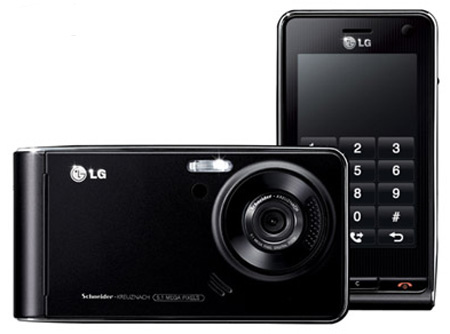
- Manufacturer: LG Electronics
- Type: Smartphone
- Availability by region: October 2007; December 2007 (KOR)
- Compatible networks: HSDPA, GSM / GPRS / EDGE Tri-Band (900/1800/1900)
- Form factor: Candybar
- Dimensions: 103.5 × 54.4 × 14.8 mm (L × W × D)
- Weight: 112 g (4 oz)
- Memory: 100 MB
- Removable storage: MicroSD
- Rear camera: 5.0 MP, VGA video 30 FPS or slo-mo QVGA video 120 FPS, strobe flash
- Front camera: VGA video call
- Display: 262K colour TFT touchscreen, 3", 240×400 (WQVGA)
- Connectivity: Bluetooth 1.2, USB 2.0

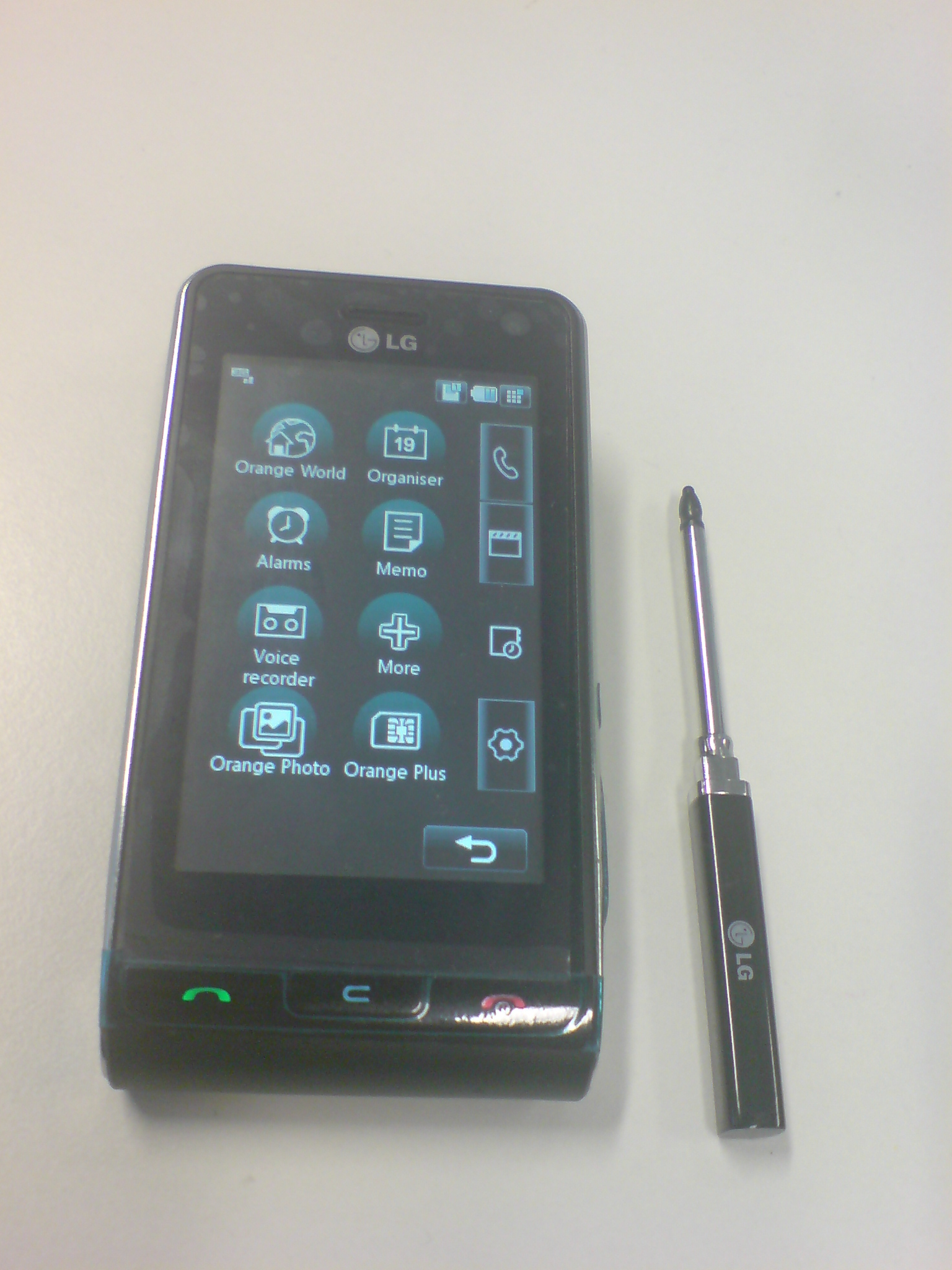
LG Viewty showing the menu screen and its stylus

The LG KU990 or LG KE990 (known and marketed as the LG Viewty) is a 3.5G touchscreen smartphone by LG Electronics, announced on August 23, 2007 and then released in Europe and Asia. A high-end model at the time of its release, the Viewty had a resistive touchscreen and was specially marketed for its camera due to its powerful camera features. The Viewty had a high gloss black look similar to the previous LG Prada, although it was also released in many other colours. In South Korea, it was known as the Beauty Phone (뷰티폰).

== Features ==
=== Camera ===
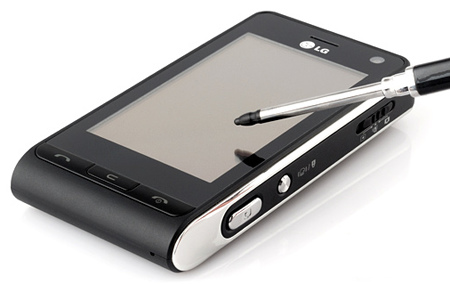
LG Viewty with stylus

A key feature of the LG Viewty is its 5-megapixel digital camera with Schneider Kreuznach optics, Xenon flash, autofocus, and a digital image stabilizer. It features an ISO 800-equivalent High-Sensitivity mode for night scenery shots and "Smart Light" for bright and clear images in the dark. It allows capturing of MP4 VGA video at 30 FPS, and QVGA at 120 FPS for slow-motion playback. According to the manufacturer, the camera's frame rate is high enough to film a balloon bursting.

The Viewty also has a front camera, designed for 3G video calling.

=== YouTube ===
In addition to being able to view YouTube videos, the LG Viewty also featured the ability to upload videos directly onto the platform.

=== Applications ===
The device supports Flash Lite 2 and MIDP Java 2.0. There are a few built-in system applications like Office and a PDF document viewer, movie and photo editor, and Obigo web browser.

=== Sliding disc ===
The rear camera has a wheel that physically rotates, which can be used for scrolling in menus, zooming in and out of webpages or changing the volume.

=== KU990i ===
An updated model, the KU990i, was later released, but only in European markets. It features a new camera module, always-on flash mode and automatic smile and face detection. However, the strobe flash is replaced by an LED, and it does not include image stabilization nor Schneider Kreuznach optics.

== Limitations ==
The organizer in the phone could only store 100 calendar events and is not officially listed on the compatible list with the popular GooSync, which helps sync phone calendars with Google Calendar (though it does work by using instructions for LG Arena).

== Model differences ==
The KU990 was the original Viewty model. The KE990 was released in 2008 and lacks 3G (HSDPA) support, but does have a camera cover. In South Korea its model numbers were LG SH10/KH2100/LH2100.

== Sales and reception ==
Mobile Phones UK praised the device, calling it a "souped-up Prada" and commenting that the Viewty "ticks all the boxes" in terms of features. TechRadar in its review wrote that the device was stylish and praised its camera and HSDPA connection, but criticised the lack of a lens cover and the "fiddly" rotating disc.

LG reported sales of 310,000 units in Europe in the first five weeks. A blog entry by UK mobile phone reseller Dial-A-Phone suggested that the Viewty was outselling the Apple iPhone in the region, citing anecdotal reports of sluggish sales and Apple's reluctance to publish figures for the iPhone in the region as evidence. The pricing and featuresets of the two phones were used as an explanation.

In January 2009, LG reported that the Viewty had sold 5 million units after 14 months on the market.

It was succeeded by the LG Renoir in 2008. A number of newer Viewty phones were then released: the Viewty Smart (GC900) in 2009, which was similar to the LG Arena but with improved camera capabilities, and two budget phones in 2010—the Viewty Snap and the Viewty Smile.

== Specification sheet ==
Feature	Specification
Form factor	Candybar
Operating system	Proprietary LG OS, with Adobe Flash user interface, Java MIDP 2.0
Network	HSDPA, GPRS, EDGE, GSM 900/1800/1900, WCDMA 2100
Dimensions	103.5 × 54.4 × 14.8 mm
Weight	112 grams
Display	262K colour TFT Touchscreen, 3.0", 400×240 pixels (Dot pitch: 0.1634 mm) with Mobile XD Engine
Camera	Frontal VGA video call and rear Sony 5.1 Megapixel camera module with Schneider Kreuznach optics, 16× zoom, xenon flash, AF, MF, image stabilizer, ISO (100-800), Smart Light
Baseband	Qualcomm 3G baseband
Video recording	VGA (640×480 or 640×384 cropped to wide) up to 30 frame/s, QVGA (320×240) up to 120 frame/s for slow motion playback, QCIF (176×144) up to 15 frame/s
Ringtone	MP3, AAC, WMA files, video ringtones, WAV and AMR voice, 72-chord/voice polyphonic
Internal memory	120 MB
CPU	140 MHz ARM9
Multimedia processor	Zoran APPROACH 5C (268 MHz)
Memory card slot	Up to 4 GB microSD
Email	SMTP, POP3, IMAP4 (SSL not supported), and APOP
Bluetooth	1.2 + A2DP
Data cable support	USB 2.0
Radio stereo	Philips stereo FM radio with RDS
Audio player	AAC, eAAC, MP3, WMA, m4a, WAV
Video player	3GP, MP4, DivX (Up to 720×480), AVI (Up to 640×480), H.263, H.264/AVC
Battery	LGIP-580A (1000 mAh)
Talk time	up to 200 minutes (WCDMA), up to 160 minutes (GSM)
Standby time	up to 330 hours (WCDMA), up to 270 hours (GSM)
Additional	Google services (including YouTube, Google Maps, Gmail, Blogger and Google Search), handwriting recognition/handwriting editing, DivX mobile profile, TV out, document viewer

== See also ==
- Information appliance
- LG Prada
- LG Secret
- Samsung Ultra Smart F700
- Nokia N95
- Nokia N82
- Sony Ericsson K850i
- iPhone
- HTC Touch
- Sony Ericsson W960
