= LG Chocolate Platinum (KE800) =

Mobile phone model

LG Chocolate KE800
- Manufacturer: LG Electronics
- Availability by region: UK, Europe, Japan, South Korea, China, Hong Kong.
- Compatible networks: GSM triband 900/1800/1900
- Form factor: Slider
- Dimensions: 96 ×48 × 16.4 mm
- Weight: 95 g (3 oz)
- Memory: 55 MB of RAM
- Removable storage: support up to 2 GB
- Battery: 800 mAh Li-Ion polymer 6-hour talk-time and 270-hour standby-time battery life
- Rear camera: 2.0 megapixel (1600×1200 pixels) photo in JPEG, video in MPEG4 QCIF(176×144 pixels), Flash
- Display: TFT, 262,144 colours, QVGA 320×240 pixels, 30 mm × 40 mm, 2.0 inches (5 cm) diagonal.
- Connectivity: USB, Bluetooth, GPRS

The LG Chocolate Platinum is an update of the LG Chocolate. It was originally introduced in Korea in June 2006 (SV600/KV6000) before being introduced internationally in November 2006 (KE800). The phone also is part of the Black Label Series II line of phones. The phone is marketed as a fashion phone, and newly contains a music player, a microSD memory card slot, as well as an FM radio.

== Updates and changes ==
The phone has been updated in features from the original LG Chocolate to include a 2.0 MP camera with auto-focus, a 320×240 pixel screen, memory card support of up to 2 GB, and an FM radio. The GUI has also been redesigned and features a new menu style (known as Arc) which is a modification of the "list view". The phone's controls remain heat-sensitive and light up red. The phone adds a dedicated loudspeaker that can now be used for calls.

== Design ==
The phone comes in two versions:

- Platinum: the bar under the screen is silver
- Gold: the bar under the screen is gold.

There is also a Limited Edition version which features a gold bar made of 14k gold.

The phone is a glossy black color, constructed of plastic; when slid up, the phone reveals a keypad alternating from black to gray, in a checkered pattern. The phone retains the same red heat-sensitive controls as the original LG Chocolate. There is a small metallic bar underneath the screen and above the directional controls that reads "Chocolate", "Black Label", or "Limited Edition". The rear of the phone has a loudspeaker and the battery and battery cover. Under the slide there is a camera with flash and a self-portrait mirror.

Under the screen wer five touch and heat-sensitive navigation buttons, which glowed red upon activation.

The retail box shares the same color scheme as the phone inside – yellow-gold and black (Gold Edition) or grey-silver and black (Platinum Edition). It is similar to the box of the other Black Label series handsets.

Included in retail box:

- LG Chocolate KE800
- Lithium-Ion polymer 800 mAh battery x2 (Two depending on country of purchase)
- LG PC Sync software
- Travel charger
- USB cable
- Instruction manual
- Phone strap and phone cleaner
- Headset 3.5 mm earphone adapter
- Earphones
- 512 MB Memory Card (depending on country of purchase)

== See also ==
- LG Electronics
- List of LG mobile phones
- LG Cyon
- LG Chocolate (KG800)
