= LG Chocolate Touch (VX8575) =

Mobile phone model

- Manufacturer: LG
- Series: LG Chocolate Series
- Availability by region: November 2009
- Predecessor: LG Chocolate 3 (LG VX-8560)
- Related: LG Touch LG8575 (Alltel and US Cellular)
- Compatible networks: Verizon Wireless
- Form factor: Bar
- Memory: 1 Gigabyte Dedicated Built-In Storage for Music
- Removable storage: Up To 8 GB MicroSD Card Slot (No Card Included)
- Battery: 850 mAh Standard Battery
- Rear camera: 3.2-megapixel, with autofocus and flash
- Front camera: none
- Display: 3.2 Inch QVGA, Resistive Touch Screen
- Connectivity: 1X Digital and 3G CDMA
- Data inputs: Touch QWERTY and Alphanumeric
- Development status: Discontinued
- Hearing aid compatibility: Yes
- Other: Colors (both battery covers included): black or purple

The LG VX8575, often referred to simply as the LG Chocolate Touch, is the fourth cellular phone in the popular LG Chocolate line with the Verizon Wireless network. Since its release in November 2009, roughly 1.2 million devices have been sold. The phone was discontinued in October 2010.

Like the other Chocolate phones, the phone has an MP3 player that runs on Dolby Mobile. The LG Chocolate Touch has a 3.2-megapixel camera. The device was also released on Alltel as the AX8575 or the LG Touch, as well as on U.S. Cellular as the UX8575 or LG Touch.

Verizon rated the battery life at 306 minutes.

== Design ==
The shell of the Chocolate Touch was reflective. The back side had a soft material. The phone included two changeable back plates, black and purple. There were three buttons beneath the display.
