= LG Prada =

Mobile phone by LG

PRADA Phone by LG

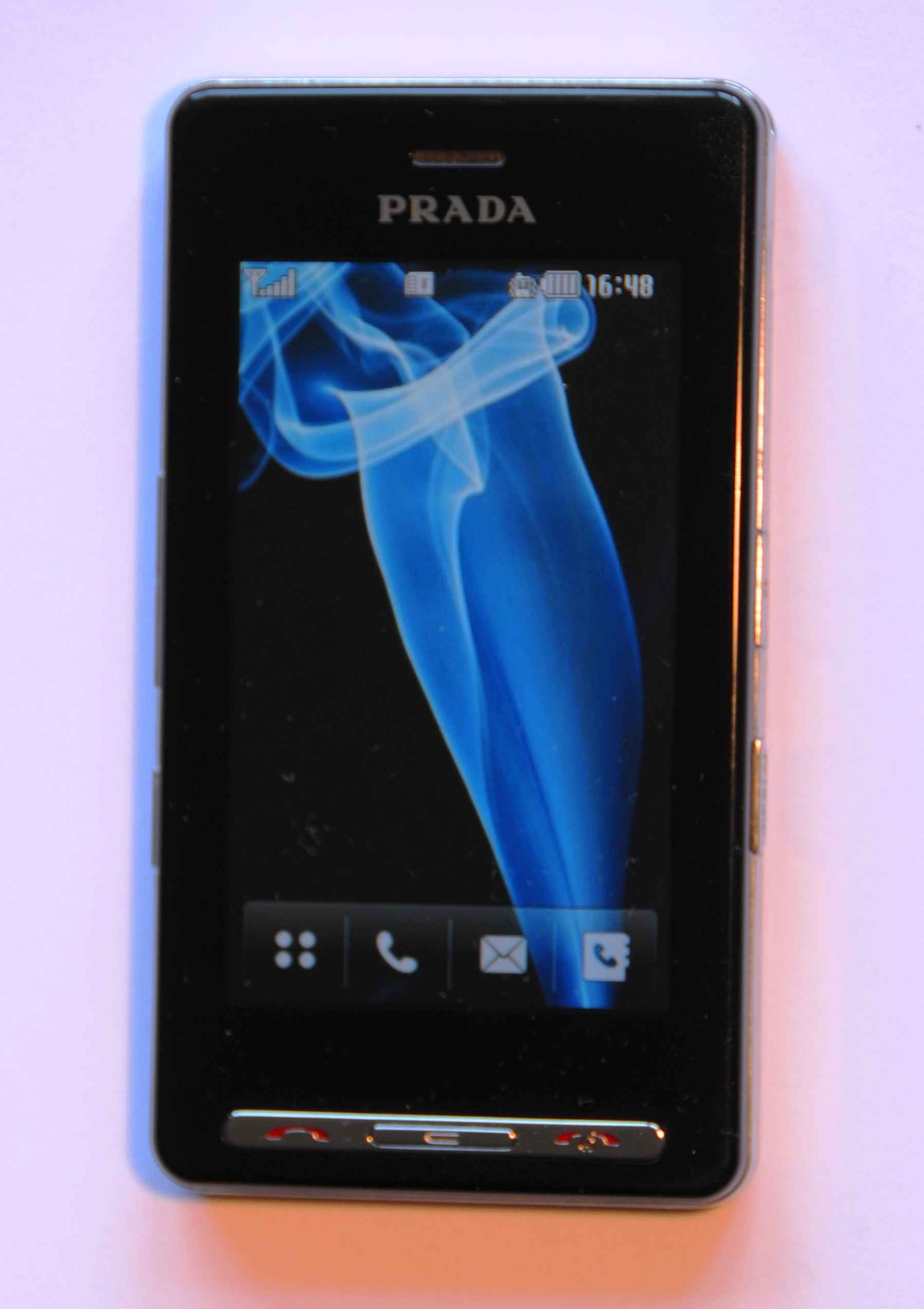
- Manufacturer: LG Electronics
- Series: LG Prada
- Availability by region: March 2007
- Successor: LG Prada II
- Related: LG Chocolate
- Compatible networks: GPRS/EDGE Tri-Band (900/1800/1900)
- Form factor: Slate
- Dimensions: 98.8×54×12 mm (3.89×2.13×0.47 in)
- Weight: 85 g
- CPU: 208 MHz Infineon S-Gold 2 PMB8876, ARM926EJ-S
- Memory: 32 MB SDRAM
- Storage: 128 MB StrataFlash NOR
- Removable storage: microSD Internal Memory Slot, behind the battery.
- Rear camera: 2 megapixel, video CIF (30 frame/s), flash
- Display: 256K color TFT touchscreen, 240 × 400 px, 5:3 ratio (~155 ppi density)
- Connectivity: Bluetooth 2.0, USB 2.0
- Website: web.archive.org/web/20070327143938/pradaphonebylg.com

The PRADA Phone by LG (KE850), better known as the LG Prada, is a touchscreen mobile phone made by LG Electronics, created in collaboration with Italian luxury designer Prada. It was first announced on 12 December 2006 and was made official in a press release on 18 January 2007.

The Prada was the first mobile device with a capacitive touchscreen, thus not requiring the use of a stylus. Its black minimalist look, designed by Kang-Heui Cha, was an evolution of LG's popular Chocolate.

The LG Prada was announced shortly before Apple CEO Steve Jobs announced the iPhone on 9 January 2007. After the release of the iPhone the head of the LG Mobile Handset R&D Center was quoted saying he believed Apple had stolen the idea from the Prada after it was announced as part of the iF Design Award, where it won a prize in March 2007.

== Features ==
The LG KE850 phone featured a glass covered touchscreen, with a monochromatic user interface based on Flash, and there are influences by Prada not only in the interface but some pre-loaded content on the device such as ringtones. There is a Micro SD slot for expandable memory, Bluetooth, and a few other extras include the ability to view PDF and Microsoft Office documents. Four games were pre-loaded: Halloween Fever, Photo Puzzle, Virus, Pipe.

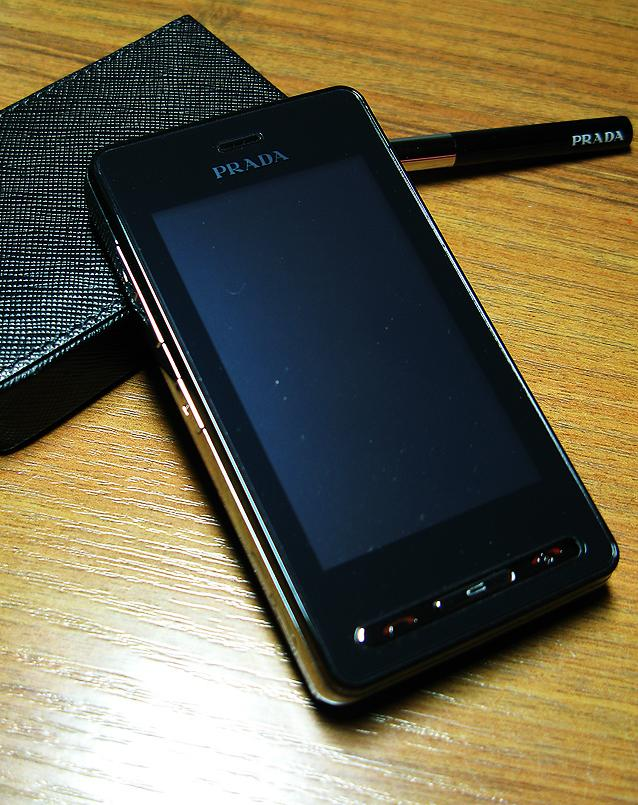
South Korean Prada model with the DMB antenna

The model released in South Korea also featured a DMB TV receiver.

== Release ==
The KE850 Prada was first released in the UK, France and Italy in March 2007, retailing for 599 euros, followed by other European territories as well as Hong Kong, Taiwan, Singapore and South Korea. It was not released in American territories.

A silver coloured model of the Prada was released in January 2008. It also featured a virtual QWERTY keyboard in place of T9.

== Reception ==
The KE850 sold 1 million units in the first 18 months. The touch slate design of the Prada would then influence those of other phones by LG, including the LG KS20 Windows Mobile smartphone, and the LG Viewty in 2007.

A successor, the LG Prada II (KF900) was announced in October 2008, as well as the LG Prada 3.0 (P940) in 2012.

== Awards ==
- International Forum Design—Product Design Award for 2007
- Red dot design award—LG Prada Wins "Best of the Best" red dot Design Award, 2007
- Fashion phone of the year—Mobile Choice (2007)
- Best fashion phone—What Mobile Awards (2007)
- Gold for best looking phone—CNET Asia Readers' Choice Award (2007/08)

== See also ==
- LG Viewty
- LG Chocolate
- iPhone (1st generation)
- Samsung P520 Giorgio Armani
- Samsung Ultra Smart F700
- Motorola Razr2
