= Raúl Prada =

Bolivian academic

Oscar Raúl Prada Alcoreza is a Bolivian philosopher and sociologist, a docent-researcher at the Universidad Mayor de San Andrés, member of the La Paz-based Comuna group of political theorists, and participant in national Bolivia politics. He served as a member of the Bolivian Constituent Assembly of 2006–2007 and as Vice Minister of Strategic Planning in the Ministry of Economy and Finance from February to September 2010. As a public intellectual, he has commented on contemporary Bolivian politics and worked with social movement organizations including CONAMAQ.

== Bibliography ==
Among Prada's publications are the following:

- Lo dado y el dato (1986)
- La subversión de la praxis (1988)
- Crítica del discurso metafísico de la economía (1988)
- Territorialidad (1998)
- Ontología de lo imaginario (1997)
- Pensar es devenir (1999)
- Genealogía del poder (2003)
- Largo octubre (2004)
- Horizontes de la Asamblea Constituyente (2006)
- Subversiones indígenas (2008)
