= LG Chocolate =

Mobile phone

LG Chocolate / CYON Chocolate

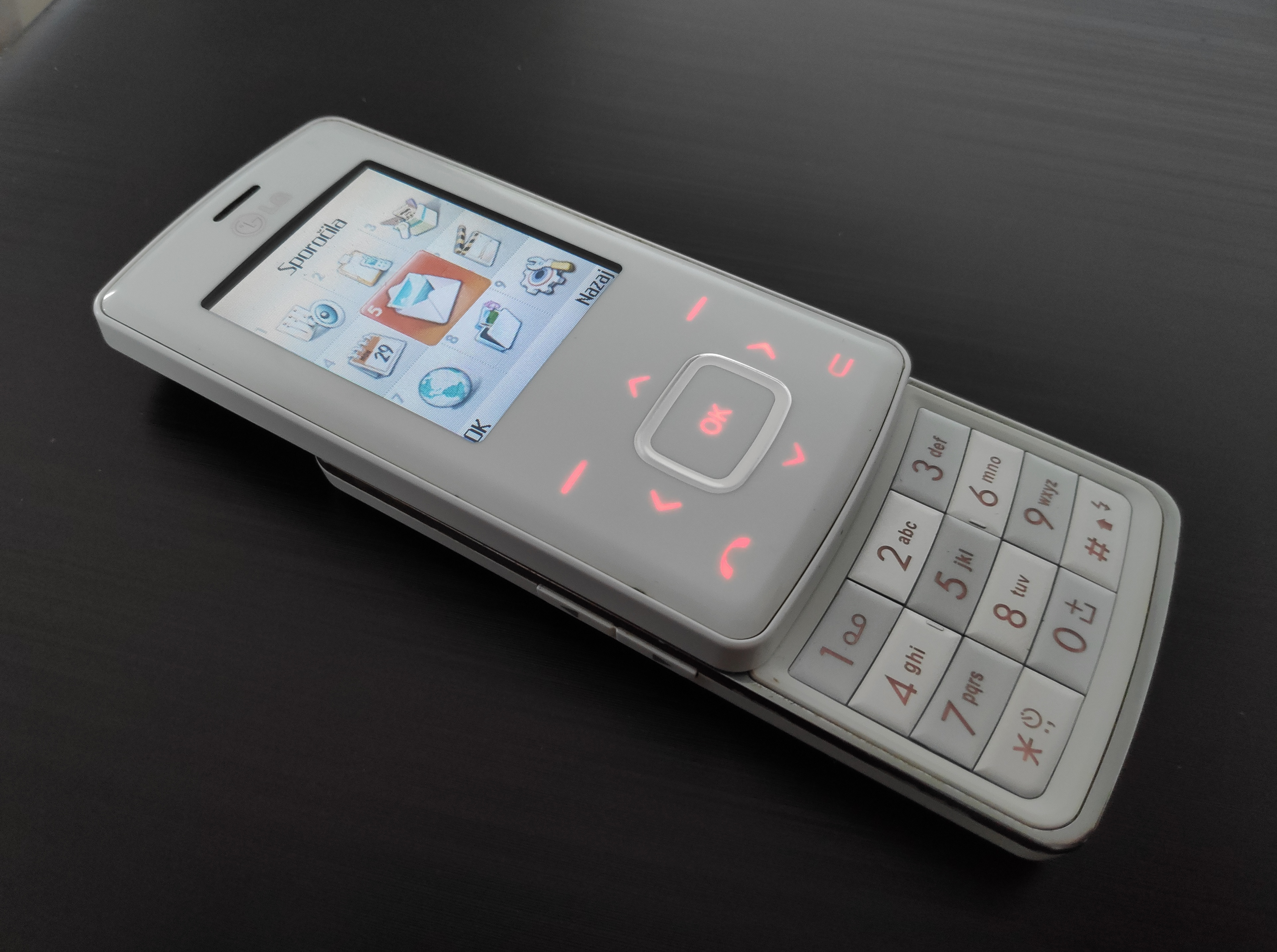
- The LG Chocolate (KG800) in white
- Manufacturer: LG Electronics
- Series: Black Label Series
- Availability by region: November 2005 (KG800)
- Successor: LG Shine
- Form factor: Slider
- Dimensions: 95 x 48 x 15.2 mm 97 x 48 x 17.5 mm (VX8500)
- Weight: 83 g (3 oz); 98 g (KU800); 100 g (VX8500)
- Memory: 128 MB / 512 MB
- Removable storage: Yes/No
- Battery: 800mAh Li-Ion
- Rear camera: 1.3 MP, 1280 x 960 pixels, video (QCIF), flash
- Front camera: N/A
- Display: TFT, 262,144 colors / 65,000 colors (KU800)
- External display: N/A
- Connectivity: USB & Bluetooth
- Model: KG800 (GSM); KU800 (GSM); TG800 (GSM); SV590 (SK Telecom); KV5900 (KT); LP5900 (LG Telecom); ID90c (Indonesia); KG90 (China); VX8500 (Verizon Wireless)

LG Chocolate is a mobile phone created by LG Electronics, the first of the LG Black Label Series. It was released at the end of 2005 in South Korea, followed by an international GSM release in 2006 (the KG800), and a slightly altered CDMA model released for Verizon Wireless in the United States (the VX8500). The LG Chocolate is a 'slider' style phone that reveals touch sensitive buttons on its face, which activate upon sliding the phone open. The Chocolate was extremely popular worldwide due to its highly fashionable design, selling over 21 million handsets.

== Features and design ==
The LG Chocolate is a feature phone in sliding style. Features include a 1.3 megapixel camera, MP3 player, and FM radio. The Korean models came with 512 MB memory while the KG800 had only 128 MB. There is no memory card slot in the original Chocolate but the 3G variant and the American CDMA variant do have it. It was considered both stylish and sleek, with touch-sensitive keys that would glow up in red, and was designed to resemble chocolate. A chief LG designer claimed the phone was designed to not look like a mobile phone. At about 83 grams and 14.4 mm thickness it was also lighter and slimmer than most phones; to achieve this, LG converted from a multi-layer structure to a single-layer and all of its parts had to be freshly developed.

== Release and variants ==
The Chocolate was released in November 2005 in South Korea during a time when simplicity became trendy. It was available in three colours: black, white, and red. The phone was so in demand in South Korea, recording 4,000 units sold on day one. The phone was backed by an advertising campaign featuring Kim Tae-hee, Hyun Bin and Daniel Henney.

It was released in China in April 2006 (GSM model KG90, CDMA model KG90c), and internationally as GSM model KG800 in May 2006, which had its marketing strategy planned and executed by John Bernard, a marketer based in the UK.

Colors included the original black (reminiscent of dark chocolate) and later white, pink and red.

=== LG KU800 ===
The KU800 is a 3G version of the KG800 Chocolate, providing higher speed UMTS connections. It was released in the UK at end 2006 by Vodafone. Its display resolution has also increased to 240x320 but with a drop in colour depth.

=== LG VX8500 (Verizon Wireless, U.S.) ===
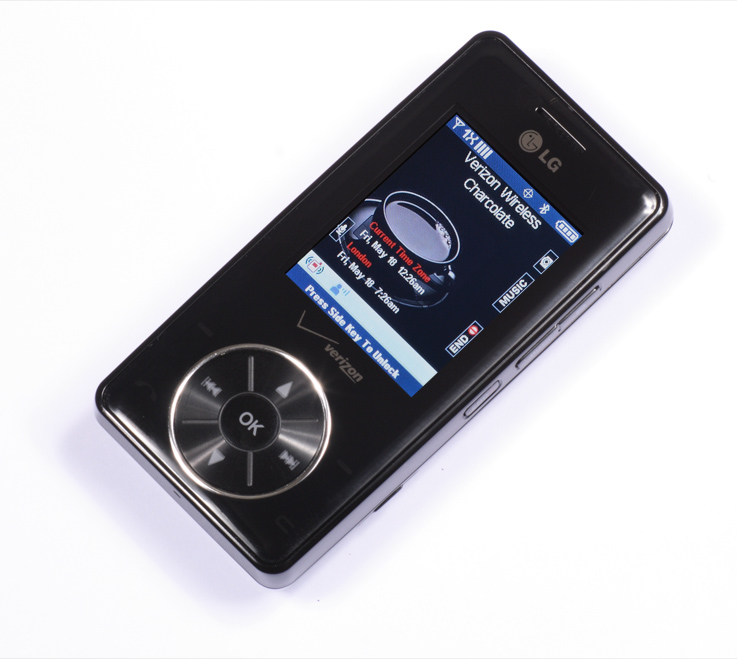
LG VX8500 Chocolate

The LG VX8500 was the LG Chocolate released in the United States on Verizon Wireless. It differed from the original Chocolate design by having physical directional keys combined with music keys, putting emphasis on music playback. The touch panel has a circular button arrangement bordered with glossy metal, versus the original Chocolate's square arrangement featuring simple arrow designs. Additionally it has an improved QVGA (320x240) display over the original Chocolate's 176x220.

It was released in July 2006 for online sale. On August 7, 2006, it was released for sale in Verizon stores. In addition to the original black “Dark Chocolate” model, the LG Chocolate VX8500 was also available in light green, white, pink, and red models called "Mint Chocolate," "White Chocolate," "Strawberry Chocolate," and "Cherry Chocolate," respectively.

The LG Chocolate had successor called the VX8550 LG Chocolate "Spin" which featured touch buttons with improved accuracy, a scroll wheel, support for 4 GB microSD cards, and tactile send and end keys.

=== LG TG800 (Canada) ===
A slightly modified version of the KG800, released as the LG TG800, was sold by Rogers Wireless and Fido in Canada, released on the market in November 2006. Additionally, Bell Mobility has a modified version of this phone that works on their CDMA/3G EVDO network despite the offering of the LG Chocolate (VX8500) in Canada available there through Telus Mobility.

== Sales and reception ==
In over half a year, 600,000 Chocolates were sold in South Korea. A total of 1.4 million units were sold in its first three months in the European, Asian, and Latin American markets. In April 2007, LG reported that Chocolate sales had topped 10 million. In December 2007, it reported 15 million sales. It eventually reached sales of over 20 million units.

== Legacy ==
Before its European debut, the phone had already won an iF Design Award and a Red Dot Design Award.

At the Mobile Choice Consumer Awards 2006, the Chocolate won the award for Best Fashion Phone, and was runner up in Phone of the Year beaten by Sony Ericsson K800i.

The Chocolate single-handedly helped turn LG Electronics's business from a loss to profit by the end of 2006.

=== Successors ===
The LG Chocolate was succeeded by the LG Shine, the second member of the LG Black Label Series.

Numerous other Chocolate-style phones were released by LG, including the LG Chocolate Platinum (KE800/SV600/KV6000), a clamshell model LG Chocolate Folder (KG810), and the LG KG320. In the United States, carrier Verizon Wireless also released several Chocolate updates, including: Chocolate Spin (VX8550), Chocolate 3 (VX8560), and Chocolate Touch (VX8575).

In 2009, LG released the New Chocolate (BL40) in Europe, Asia and Canada, alongside a non-touch New Chocolate model BL20.

== Specifications ==
KG800

Display	256,000 colour, TFT type, 176×220 size
Dimensions	95 x 48 x 15.2mm
Weight	83g
Standbytime	Up to 200hrs
Band (in MHZ)	900 / 1800 / 1900 (Tri-band)
Sound	64 Polyphonic
WAP browser	2.0
Messaging	SMS, EMS, MMS, Email
Connectivity	Bluetooth, USB data kit

VX8500

Type	Specification
Modes	CDMA 800 / CDMA 1900 / GSM
Weight	3.53 oz (100 g)
Dimensions	3.80" x 1.88" x 0.69" (97 x 48 x 16 mm)
Battery Life	Talk: 3.50 hours (210 minutes) Standby: 384 hours (16 days) batteries were known to have a defect as they were released in December 2006. They did not hold a full charge.
Battery Type	LiPolymer 800 mAh
Display	Type: LCD (Color TFT/TFD) Colors: 262,144 (18-bit) Size: 240 x 320 pixels
Memory	Phone:61800 KB Music:62881 KB (micro SD memory cards are available in 1 GB, 2 GB, 4 GB, 6 GB, and 8 GB.
Camera	Resolution: 1+ megapixel self-timer, night mode functions / brightness, white balance controls
Video Capture	Max. Length: 1 hour QCIF resolution / 3GPP2 format
