= LG Prada 3.0 =

Smartphone model

Prada Phone By LG 3.0 or LG Prada 3.0
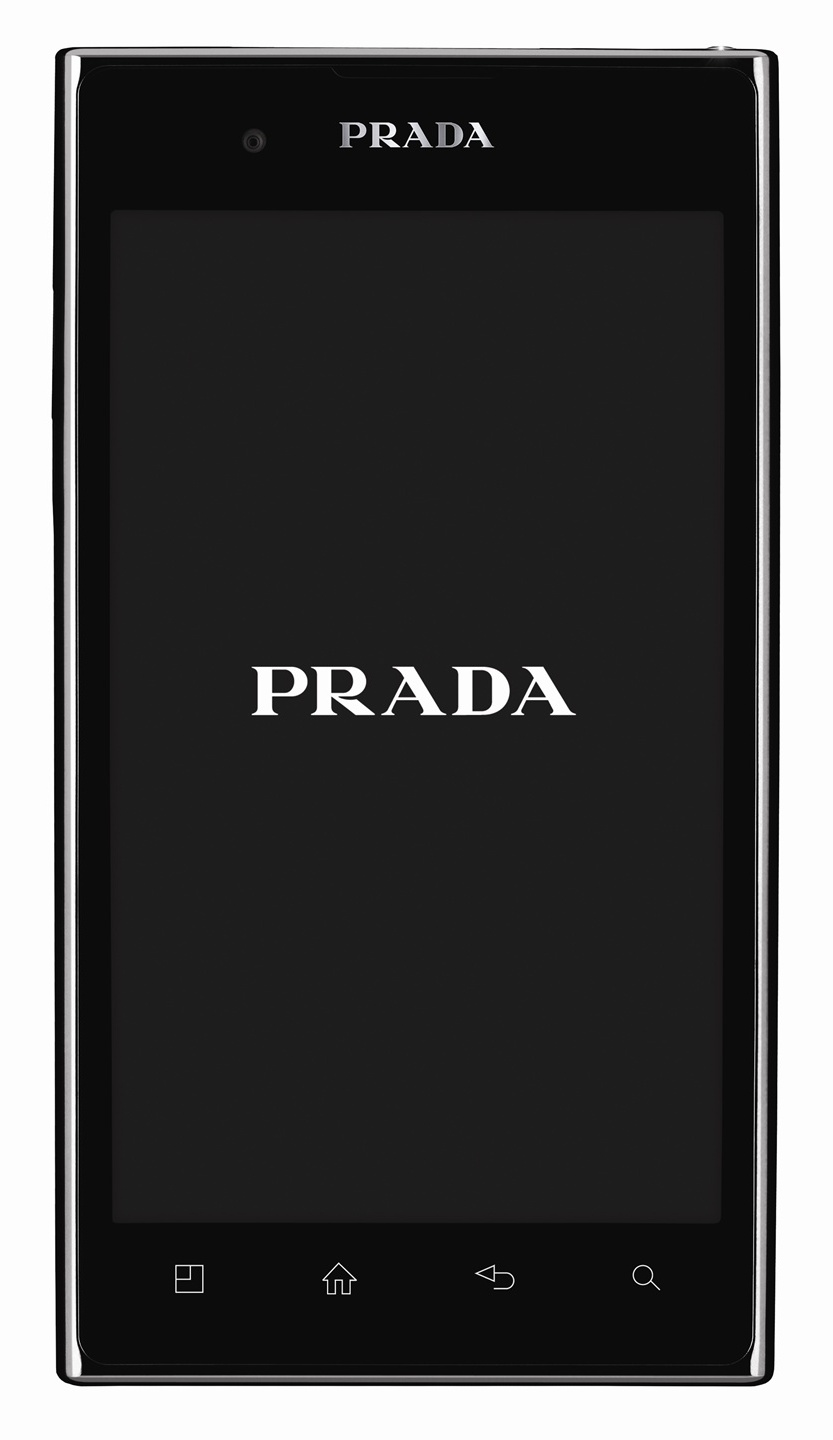
- LG Prada 3.0 publicity image
- Brand: PRADA/LG
- Manufacturer: LG
- Type: Smartphone
- Series: Prada Phone By LG
- First released: December 28, 2011; 14 years ago
- Predecessor: LG Prada II
- Successor: LG Optimus 4X HD (indirect); LG Optimus G (indirect)
- Related: LG Prada
- Compatible networks: 2G: 850/900/1800/1900 MHz; 3G: 900/1900/2100 MHz (international LG-P940); CDMA 800 MHz (global/CDMA); Korean PCS CDMA 1.8 GHz (LG U+)
- Form factor: Slate
- Dimensions: 127.5×69×8.5 mm (5.02×2.72×0.33 in)
- Weight: 138 g (5 oz)
- Operating system: Android 2.3
- CPU: 1 GHz dual-core ARM Cortex-A9 SoC CPU; TI OMAP4430
- GPU: PowerVR SGX540
- Memory: 1 GB RAM
- Storage: 8 GB (Global); 16 GB (South Korea); 4 GB (Japan/NTT DoCoMo)
- Removable storage: MicroSD up to 32 GB
- Battery: 1540 mAh
- Rear camera: 8 megapixels with LED flash
- Front camera: 1.3 megapixels
- Display: IPS nova 480 x 800 pixels, 4.3", 800 nits
- Connectivity: Wi-Fi 802.11 b/g/n, Wi-Fi hotspot; DLNA; Bluetooth v3.0 with A2DP & EDR; NFC; microUSB v2.0; MHL (optional)
- Data inputs: Multi-touch touch screen, accelerometer, proximity, compass, aGPS and a stereo FM radio
- Other: FM radio Mobile terrestrial TV (market-specific): South Korea: DMB; Japan: Oneseg

LG Prada 3.0 (also branded as Prada phone by LG 3.0) is the third and final smartphone in the LG Prada phone series. It is the successor to the LG Prada II and the LG Prada.

The device was marketed as a premium high-spec limited-production luxury phone on the weight of its Prada branding. LG and Prada featured a number of celebrities in their marketing campaign for the phone.

== Launch and availability ==
At its UK launch near 27 January 2012, the phone's no-contract retail price was approximately £430. Shortly before late May 2012, it was £400; after May 31, the price was reduced to £239.99; and in September 2012, the price was further reduced to £149.

In India, the initial price was ₹30,000 (US$310).

=== Asia ===
Country	Release date	Model
Korea	28 December 2011	SK Telecom LG-SU540 KT LG-KU5400 LG U+ LG-LU5400
Japan	March 9, 2012	NTT DoCoMo L-02D

=== Europe ===
Model numbers: LG-P940, LG-P940h

== Hardware ==
LG Prada 3.0 runs on a dual-core 1 GHz ARM Cortex A-9 (TI OMAP4430) CPU and a PowerVR SGX540 GPU.

This phone has a RAM capacity of 1 GB and 6.2 GB of ROM.

The device has an 8-megapixel primary camera with LED flash, and support for 1080p video recording. The phone also carries a 1.3-megapixel front camera for video calls.

== Software ==
Prada 3.0 comes with Android 2.3 pre-installed. In 2012, LG scheduled a release of Android ICS to several of its smartphone models, including Prada 3.0.

In early July 2012, LG rolled out Android Ice Cream Sandwich 4.0.4 to unlocked P940 models in Germany and Italy. To perform the upgrade, LG's Windows-only support tool and drivers are required to be installed. At the same time, LG also released the upgrade in the UK.

== See also ==
- LG Prada (KE850)
- LG Prada II
