= LG Prada II =

2008 mobile phone by LG

PRADA II by LG
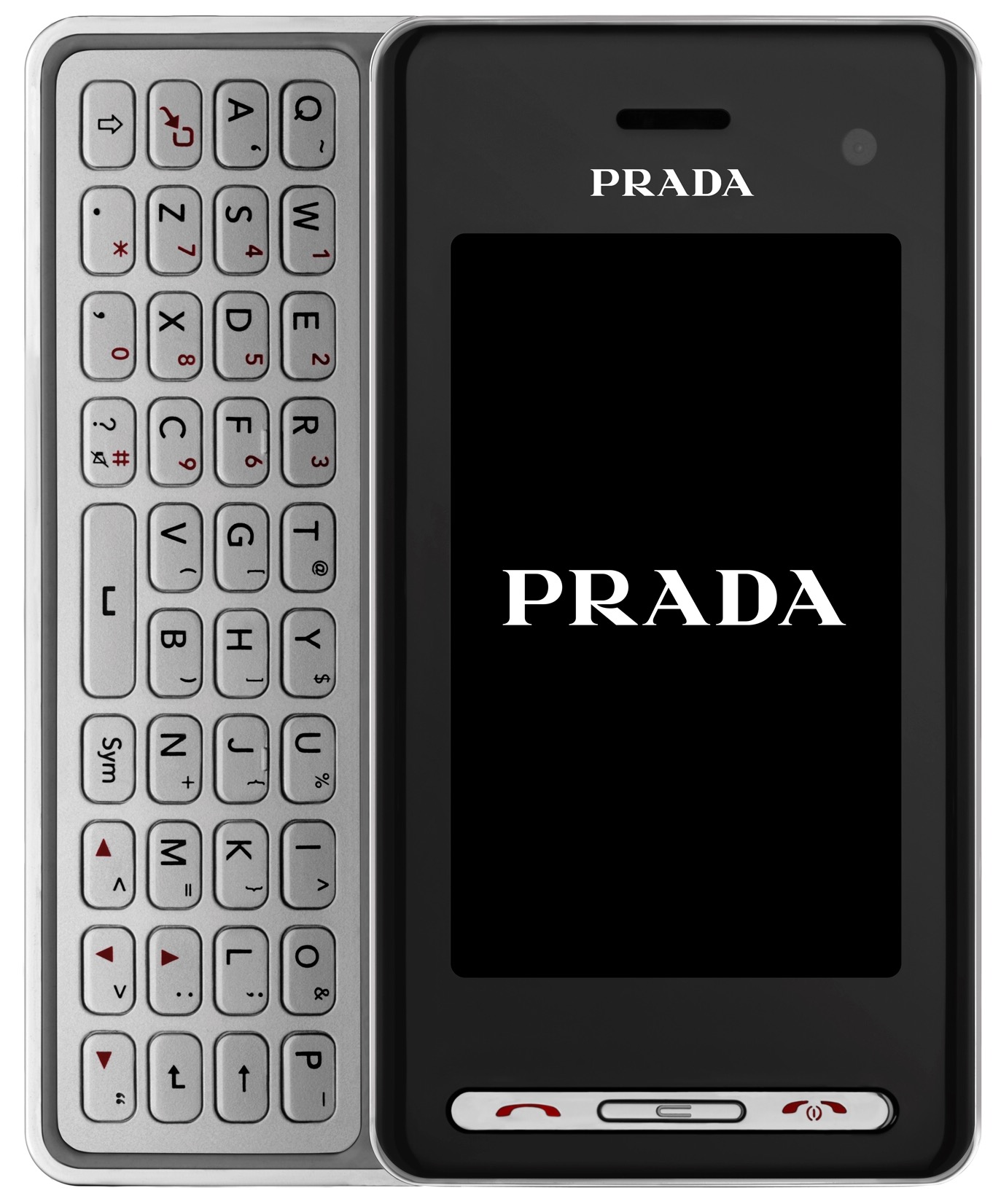
- Manufacturer: LG Electronics
- Predecessor: LG Prada
- Successor: LG Prada 3.0
- Compatible networks: GSM, EDGE, UMTS, HSDPA
- Form factor: Candybar/Slide
- Dimensions: 104.4×54×16.75 mm
- Weight: 130 g
- Memory: microSD Internal Memory Slot
- Rear camera: 5 megapixel with auto-focus and flash, plus front-facing camera
- Display: 256K color TFT touchscreen, 240 x 400 px
- Connectivity: Bluetooth 2.1, USB 2.0, WiFi

The LG KF900, also known as the LG Prada II, is a touchscreen, with slide out QWERTY keyboard, mobile phone made by LG Electronics. It is the second version of the Prada phone, following the original LG Prada (KE850). The phone's looks are basically the same as the original Prada, but the Prada II is slightly thicker, taller and heavier, to support a slide-out full QWERTY keyboard. There is also a front-facing camera for use with video calling. The interface has been updated from the original. The camera has been increased from 2 to 5 megapixels with a LED photolight. The Prada II also now supports 3G and HSDPA for faster internet browsing. The Prada II has support for the Prada Link, which is Bluetooth watch that allows information on incoming phone calls or text messages, the phone's alarm, or the world time clock.

The LG Prada II (KF900) was announced on October 13, 2008. It was released in December 2008.

== Features ==
- Capacitive, Multi-touch Touch Screen
- Music Player (MP3, AAC, AAC+, WMA, RA)
- Multitasking
- Video Player (MPEG4, H.263, H.264)
- Active Flash UI
- Document Viewer (.ppt, .doc, .xls, .pdf, .txt)
- Accelerometer
- Full QWERTY keyboard

== Specifications ==
General

- Form Factor: Touchscreen with slide-out QWERTY keyboard
- Dimensions: 104.4×54×16.75 mm
- Weight: 130 g
- Main Screen Type: TFT multi-touch touchscreen, 256K colors
- Main Screen Size/Resolution: 240 x 400 pixels, 3 inches
- Messaging: SMS, EMS, MMS, Email
- Operating System: Flash UI
- Built-in Hands-free: Yes
- Voice-dial/memo: Yes
- Vibration: Yes
- Organizer: Yes
- Office Document Viewer: .ppt, .doc, .xls, .pdf, .txt
- Battery Stand-By: Up to 400 h
- Battery Talk Time: Up to 3 h

Connectivity'

- 3G Network: GSM 900 / 1800 / 1900
- HSDPA: 7.2 Mbit/s
- Bluetooth: Yes, v2.0 with A2DP
- USB: Yes, v2.0
- WiFi

Multimedia

- Main camera: 5 MP, 2592x1944 pixels, with Schneider-Kreuznach certified lens
- Front-facing camera: used for video calling
- Internal Memory: 60 MB shared memory
- Memory Slot: microSD (TransFlash), up to 8 GB
- Music: MP3, WAV, WMA, MIDI, AAC, AAC+, eAAC+, RA, AMR-NB
- Video: MPEG4, H.263, H.264, 3GP, RV
- Radio: Yes
- Ringtones: Polyphonic (40 channels), MP3
- Speakers: Built-in handsfree

Latest Software Version: V10P (download located here)

== See also ==
- LG Prada (KE850)
- LG Prada 3.0 (P940)
