= The Devil Wears Prada =

The Devil Wears Prada may refer to:

- The Devil Wears Prada (novel), a 2003 roman à clef by Lauren Weisberger
  - The Devil Wears Prada (film), a 2006 screen adaptation of the novel
    - The Devil Wears Prada (soundtrack), music from the 2006 film
  - The Devil Wears Prada 2, a 2026 sequel to the film adaptation
    - The Devil Wears Prada 2 (soundtrack), music from the 2026 film
- The Devil Wears Prada (musical), first staged in 2022
- The Devil Wears Prada (band), an American metalcore group formed in 2005
- Revenge Wears Prada: The Devil Returns, a 2013 sequel novel by Lauren Weisberger
