= LG Shine =

Mobile phone

LG Shine (KE970)

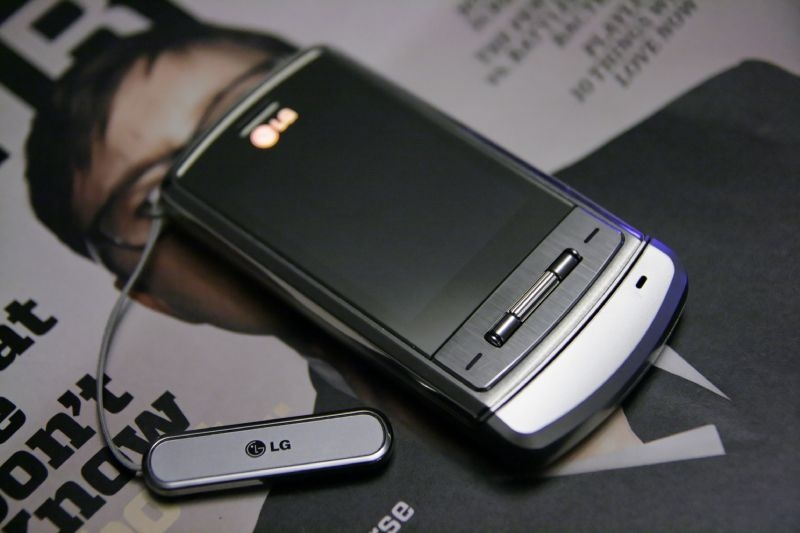
- Manufacturer: LG Electronics
- Series: Black Label Series
- Predecessor: LG Chocolate
- Successor: LG Secret
- Related: Official Shine Website
- Compatible networks: GSM (KE970 900/1800/1900 - ME970 850/1800/1900; EDGE / GPRS
- Form factor: Slider
- Dimensions: 99.8×50.6×13.8 mm (3.93×1.99×0.54 in)
- Weight: 118 g (4 oz)
- Operating system: APOXI, Java MIDP 2.0
- CPU: 208 MHz Infineon S-Gold 2 PMB8876, ARM926EJ-S
- Memory: 32 MB SDRAM
- Storage: 128 MB StrataFlash NOR
- Removable storage: microSD (TransFlash) external memory card slot
- Battery: 800mAh Li-Ion
- Rear camera: 2.0 megapixels Autofocus; Schneider-Kreuznach
- Front camera: QCIF Video (320x240), VGA camera (U970 only)
- Display: 240 x 320, 2.2" Display; 262K-color TFT LCD
- Connectivity: USB & Bluetooth V 1.2

The LG Shine (a.k.a. SV420, KE970, KG970, KU970, ME970, U970, CU720, TU720, KG70, L705iX) is a slider-style mobile phone manufactured by LG Electronics, the second installment of LG Black Label Series, followed by LG Secret. It was originally introduced as the LG Cyon SV420 in the Asian market in November 2006, and debuted for other regions in February 2007. The LG Shine is similar to the LG Incite.

According to LG Electronics on 2008 November 18, the company has sold total 1.35 million units and 8.65 million units of Shine Phone in domestic and overseas markets coming into this month, surpassing the total sales of 10 million units in both markets.

A clamshell shiny metal phone variant (model VX8700, also known as LG Shine Flip), for CDMA carriers such as Verizon Wireless, Bell Mobility and Telus Mobility, was released around the same time as the regular Shine. Despite the differences in the form factor, otherwise the features and appearance of the Shine and VX8700 are similar.

== Design ==
The LG KE970 takes on a slider form; featuring a polished-metal exterior and stainless steel case. The display is a large 2.25-inch (240x320 pixels) screen capable of 256,000 colors, which doubles as a mirror when the screen is not used. Instead of the touch-sensitive controls found on the LG Chocolate, it uses a scroll bar for up and down navigation and two buttons for side-to-side navigation. Some variations of the slider model utilize a joystick button for scrolling up/down and side to side.

North America has 2 modified versions of two is that the ME770 has the 850 MHz (U.S./Canada/Latin America/Brazil) and the KE770 doesn't.

== Features ==
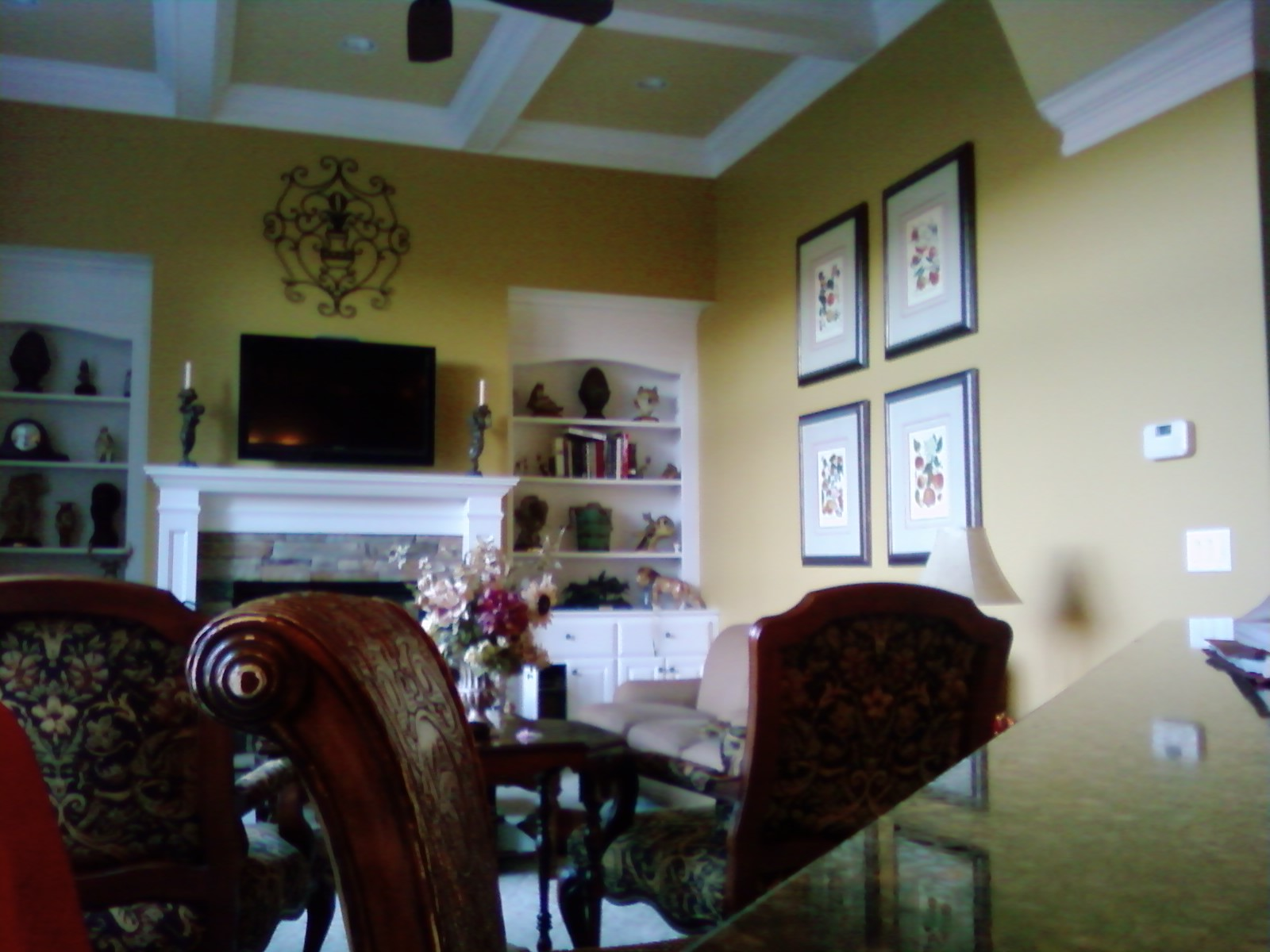
LG Shine photo sample.

- All metal design
- Mirror finish display
- QVGA display resolution
- 2 megapixel autofocus camera with Schneider-Kreuznach lens
- Scroller navigation
- microSD memory card slot up to 2Gb
- Office documents viewer
- Slim design
- MP3 Player
- USB Connection
- Bluetooth 1.2
- Voice Messaging

== Special Editions ==
=== Titanium Black Edition ===
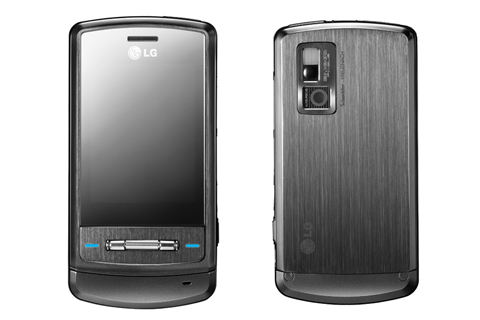
LG Shine "Titanium Black" Edition

In July 2008, LG Electronics unveiled the LG Shine "Titanium Black". Offering the same features as the original LG Shine, the full metal bodied jacket has received a makeover, turning it a dark metallic grey.

=== Andy Lau Edition ===
In August 2008, LG Electronics launched the LG "Shine x Andy Lau Special Edition". The phone comes complete with the actor's own handwriting inscribed motto on the back of the phone which says "Heaven is where the kind hearted people are."

=== Iron Man Edition ===
In May 2008, an extremely limited Iron Man edition was issued. The 21 made had a red case, gold plated highlights, and an 18k gold battery cover.

=== Gold Edition ===
In July 2007, LG Electronics unveiled the LG Shine "Gold". Offering the same features as the original LG Shine though, in a shiny gold colour. This version was somewhat more expensive than the standard edition.

=== U970 ===
The main factors that differentiate the U970 are the lack of a microSD card reader and the addition of HSDPA and a front camera for videoconferencing. The phone has a stainless steel full metal body with a half-mirror screen, so the front of the phone appears to be a mirror when the screen is off. When the phone is closed there is a multi-functional scroll key. The phone can also be used as a camera, with a dedicated button for taking pictures. The maximum resolution for pictures is 1600x1200 px. The camera has auto focus certified by Schneider-Kreuznach. The phone can be charged with the included proprietary USB cable which plugs into the only port on the phone, making it impossible to use the included headset while charging, although it is still possible to use the phone while charging.

== In popular culture ==
This model appeared on a L'Oréal Hair Colourant TV commercial.

In 2024, this model appeared on a drama Lovely Runner, as cellular phone used by Ryu Sun-jae, a character played by Byeon Woo-seok.

== Awards ==
- Red dot design award - LG Shine won the Red dot design award 2007
- Shiny Awards 2007 - Best Fashion Mobile
