= LG Chocolate 3 (VX8560) =

Phone

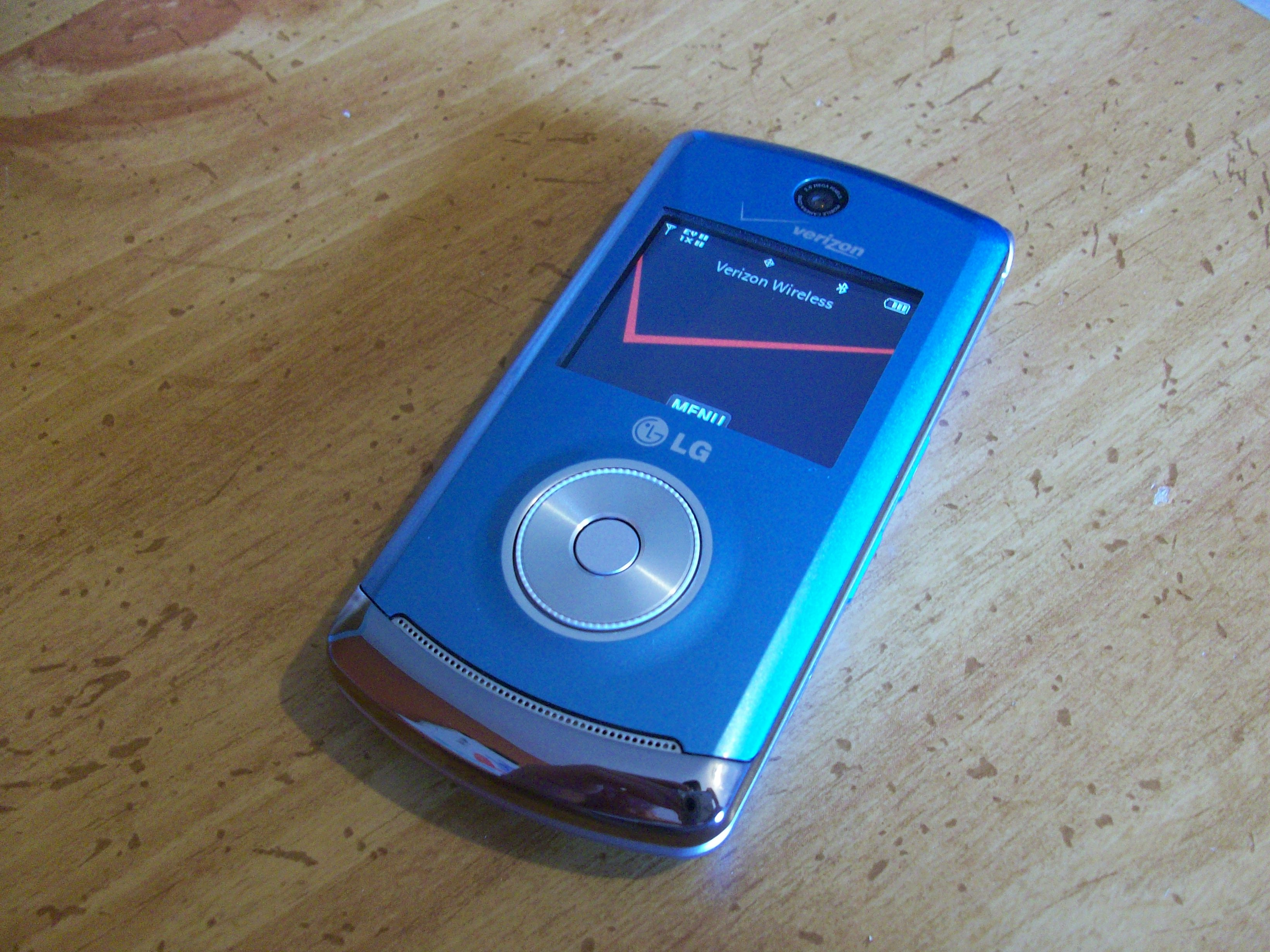
- Availability by region: 2008
- Successor: LG Chocolate Touch
- Compatible networks: CDMA
- Dimensions: 3.87×1.94×0.64 in (98×49×16 mm)
- Weight: 3.36 oz (95 g)
- Memory: 1 GB (internal)
- Display: LCD 240 × 320 pixels (262144 colors)
- Connectivity: Bluetooth / USB cable

The LG Chocolate 3 (also known as the VX8560 or the upgraded VX8560EX) is a feature phone, and the successor to the LG Chocolate mobile phone, available on Verizon Wireless in the US and Telus in Canada. It was released online on July 14, 2008. The phone features several updates from the previous VX8500 Chocolate series, including a clamshell design, an external display, and a built-in FM transmitter.

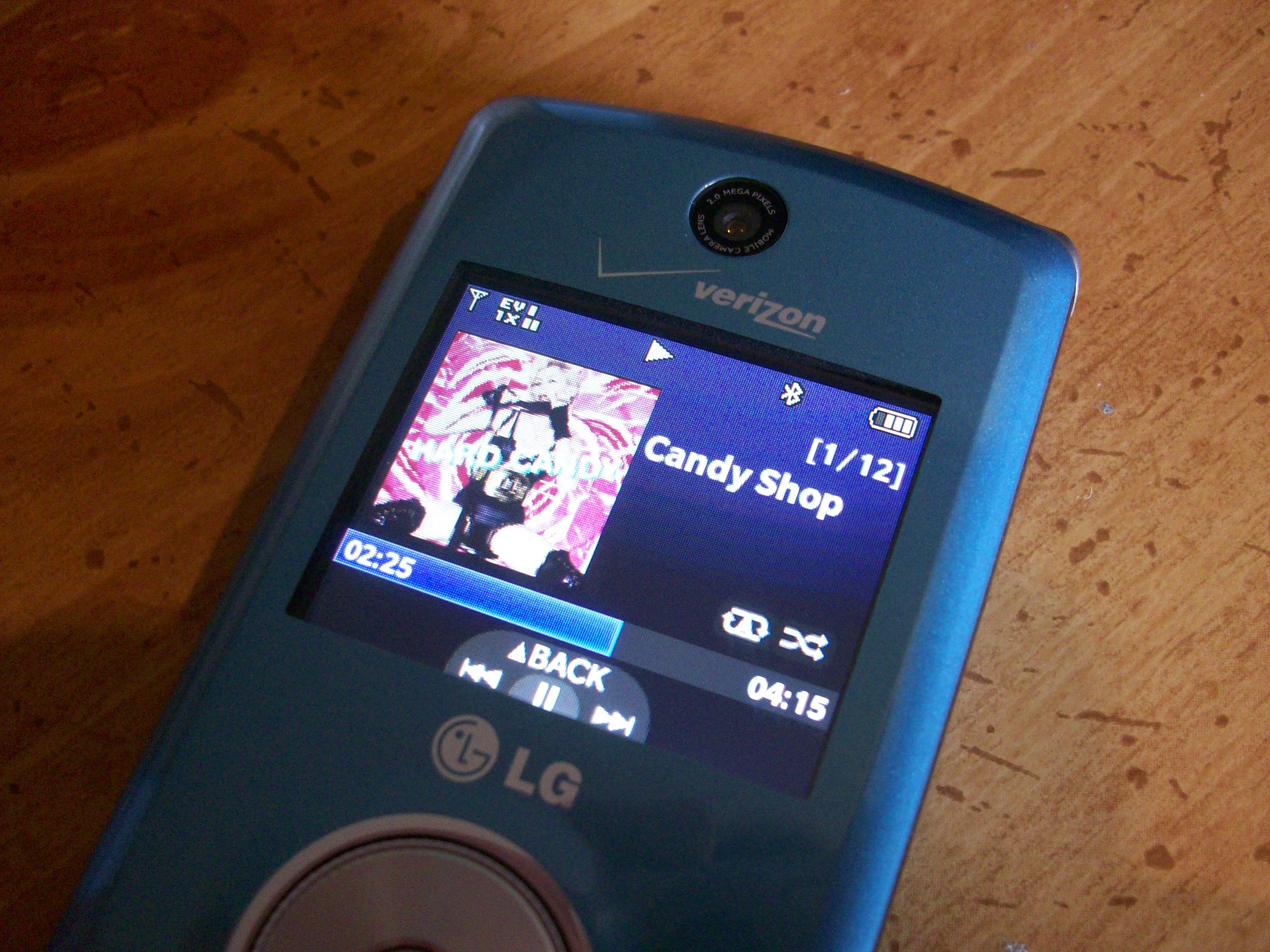
Here the LG Chocolate3 is shown playing music using the external screen.

== Specifications ==
The complete LG VX8560 list of specifications are:

Type	Specification
Modes	CDMA 800 / CDMA 1900 (Digital Dual-Band)
Weight	3.36 oz
Dimensions	3.87" × 1.94" × .64"
Form factor	Clamshell - internal antenna
Battery life	Talk: up to 270 minutes (≈3+ hours) / Standby: up to 350 hours (≈14+ days)
Battery type	Lithium Ion 800 mAh (1500 mAH optional battery available)
Display	Type: LCD (color TFT/TFD) Colors: 262,144 (18-bit) Size: 240 × 320 pixels
Platform / OS	Qualcomm BREW 3.1.5.145 Software: 2.0.5.v1)
Memory	1 GB (built-in, flash shared memory)
Phone Book Capacity	1000
2nd Display	Location: Front 260,000-color TFT LCD / 220 × 176 pixels
Alarm	Yes
Bluetooth	version 2.1+EDR (Enhanced Date Rate)/ Headset, Hands–Free, Dial–Up networking, Advanced Audio Distribution (stereo), Phonebook Access, Basic Printing, Object Push for vCard and Calendar, File Transfer and Basic Imaging
BREW	Yes
Java	No
Calculator	Yes (includes Tip Calculator)
Calendar	Yes
Camera	Resolution: 1.3 (or 2.0 with the VX8560EX) megapixel no-flash / self-timer, night mode, macro mode func
Custom graphics	Yes
Custom ringtones	Yes
Data-capable	Yes
Digital TTY/TDD	Yes
EMS / Picture Messaging	Yes
Expansion card	Card type: microSD
Games	Yes
GPS / Location	Yes
Headset jack (3.5 mm)	Yes (Note: This is a headphone (3.5 mm or 1/8 inch) jack for use with ears buds and the like.)
Hearing Aid compatible	Rating: M3 (mostly compatible)
High-Speed data	Technology: 1xEV-DO r0
Low-Speed Data	"Quick 2 Net" (QNC): unsupported
Media Center	Software Version: 3.1.5.145
MMS	Yes
Multiple Languages	Languages Supported: English, Spanish
Multiple Numbers per Name	Numbers per entry: 5 plus 2 email addresses
Music Player	Supported Formats: WMA, DRM WMA, and MP3 with equalizer
Music Transmitter	Built-in FM Transmitter 87.5 MHz - 107.9 MHz
Picture ID	Yes
Polyphonic Ringtones	Chords: 72
Predictive Text Entry	Technology: T9
Side Keys	on left and right when closed
Speaker Phone	Type: Full-Duplex
Streaming Multimedia	Yes
Text Messaging	2-Way: Yes
USB	Yes
Vibrate	Yes
Video capture	Yes
Voice Dialing	speaker-independent / plus voice command and text-to-speech
Voice Memo	Number of entries: 200 up to 1 minute or 60 minute each
Wireless Internet	Browser software: Openwave 6.2.3.2
