= LG Cyon =

Domestic South Korean mobile phone brand made by LG

CYON logo

CYON (Korean: 싸이언) was LG Electronics's mobile phone brand for the domestic South Korean market. LG established the brand in 1997. It was used until 2011, when LG Electronics retired the Cyon brand and all new mobile phones were rebranded as LG.

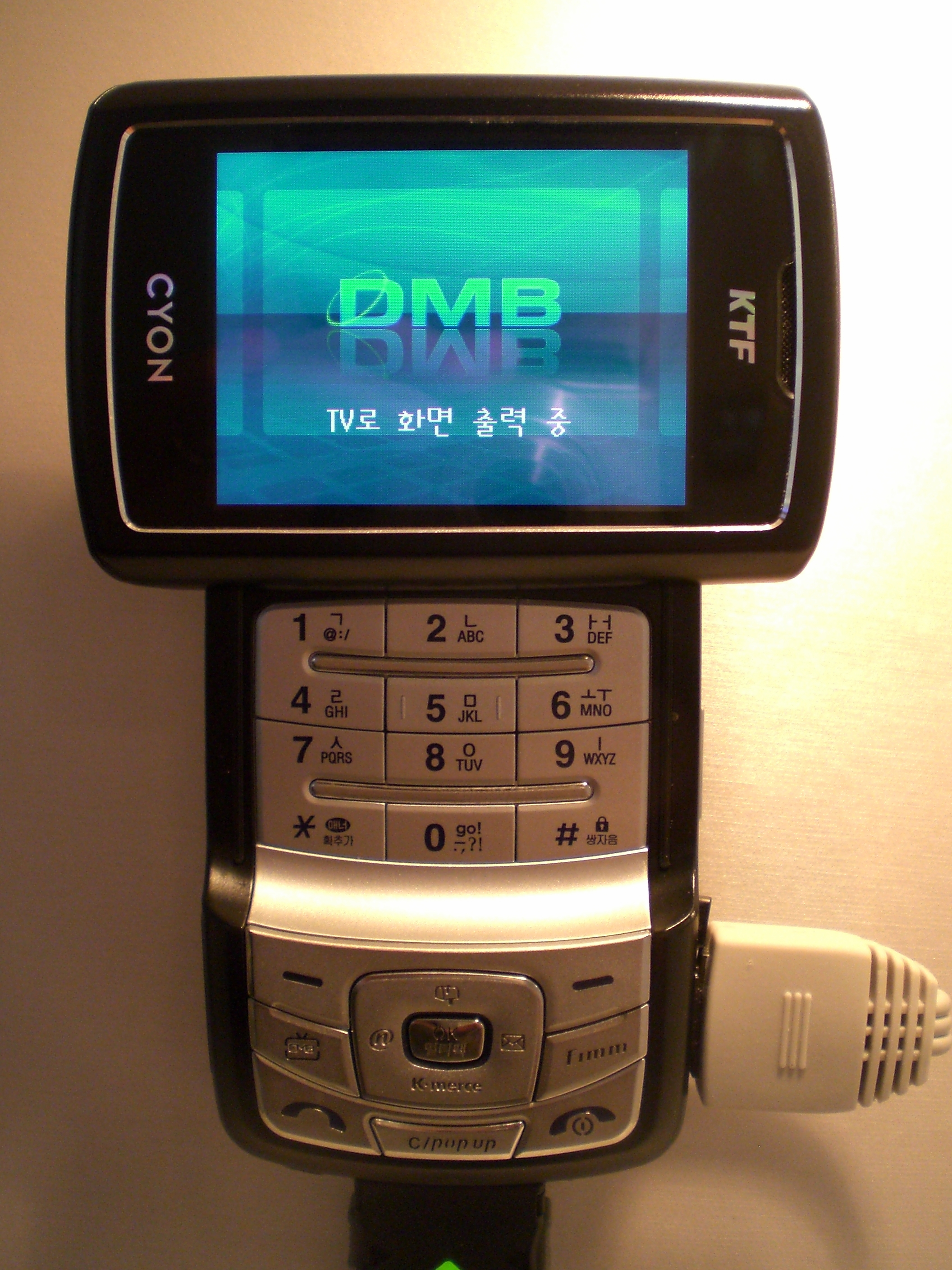
A CYON-branded phone (KB-1500)

== Origin of the name ==
From the original "Hwatong (화통)" it is renamed several times, into "Freeway" and then "CiON" or "CION", meaning a descendant of a noble blood. And then it is respelled into "CyON", and later to "CYON". When it was being respelled into CyON, it is said that the name was loosely derived from "cyber-on", implying connectivity to the "cyberspace" (or "cybernetic space"), where, in turn, "cyber-" and "cybernetics" find its etymology in Greek κυβερνήτης (steersman, skipper, guide, governor).

== See also ==
- Samsung Anycall
- SK Telecom
- KTF
- LG Telecom
- Anycall
- SK Teletech
- Pantech Curitel
- VK Mobile
- KTF Ever
